= Belle and Sebastian discography =

Band discography

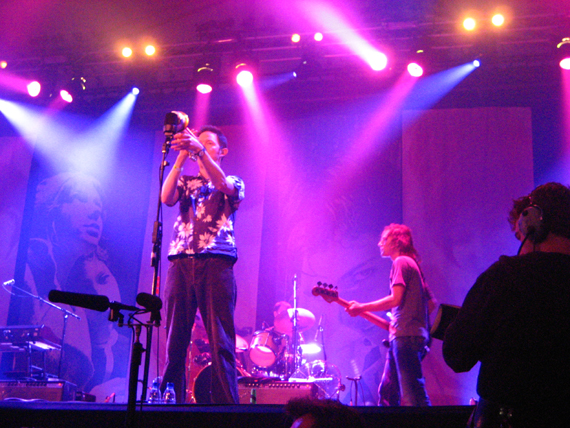
- Belle and Sebastian perform at Pukkelpop in 2006.
- Studio albums: 12
- Extended plays: 9
- Live albums: 4
- Compilation albums: 5
- Singles: 22
- Video albums: 1

The discography of Belle and Sebastian, a Scottish indie pop band, features twelve studio albums, three compilation albums, four live albums, two box sets, nine extended plays (EPs), 21 singles and one DVD. It also includes a variety of demos and non-album singles, as well as two DJ mix compilations.

== Studio albums ==
Title	Details	Peak chart positions											Certifications (sales thresholds)
Title	Details	UK	AUS	AUT	FRA	GER	IRE	NED	NOR	SWE	SWI	US	Certifications (sales thresholds)
Tigermilk	Released: 6 June 1996; Label: Electric Honey (EHRLP005); Format: CD, CS, DL, LP	13	—	—	68	—	—	—	20	15	—	—	BPI: Gold
If You're Feeling Sinister	Released: 18 November 1996; Label: Jeepster (JPRCD 001); Format: CD, CS, DL, LP	191	—	—	—	—	—	—	23	—	—	—	BPI: Gold
The Boy with the Arab Strap	Released: 7 September 1998; Label: Jeepster (JPRCD 003); Format: CD, CS, DL, LP	12	—	—	39	—	—	—	7	30	—	—	BPI: Gold
Fold Your Hands Child, You Walk Like a Peasant	Released: 6 June 2000; Label: Jeepster (JPRCD 010); Format: CD, DL, LP, MD	10	53	—	54	52	25	—	17	11	—	80	BPI: Silver
Storytelling	Released: 3 June 2002; Label: Jeepster (JPRCD 014); Format: CD, DL, LP	26	—	—	55	99	42	—	32	29	—	150	
Dear Catastrophe Waitress	Released: 6 October 2003; Label: Rough Trade (RTRADECD 080); Format: CD, DL, LP	21	88	—	76	64	25	58	10	16	—	84	BPI: Gold
The Life Pursuit	Released: 6 February 2006; Label: Rough Trade (RTRADCD 280); Format: CD, CD+DVD-V, DL, LP	8	45	56	72	35	23	32	16	20	56	65	BPI: Silver
Write About Love	Released: 11 October 2010; Label: Rough Trade (RTRADCD480); Format: CD, DL, LP	8	74	40	54	38	21	41	28	18	37	15	
Girls in Peacetime Want to Dance	Released: 19 January 2015; Label: Matador (OLE-1056-2); Format: CD, DL, LP	9	57	28	49	30	14	12	23	31	26	28	
Days of the Bagnold Summer	Released: 13 September 2019; Label: Matador; Format: CD, DL, LP	73	—	—	—	—	—	—	—	—	98	—	
A Bit of Previous	Released: 6 May 2022; Label: Matador; Format: CD, DL, LP	8	—	50	—	31	—	—	—	—	31	—	
Late Developers	Released: 13 January 2023; Label: Matador; Format: CD, DL, LP	30	—	—	—	—	—	—	—	—	82	—	
"—" denotes a release that did not chart or was not released in that territory.

== Compilation albums ==
Title	Details	Peak chart positions									
Title	Details	UK	AUT	FRA	GER	IRE	NED	SPA	SWE	SWI	US
Push Barman to Open Old Wounds	Released: 24 May 2005; Label: Jeepster (JPRCD 015); Format: CD, DL, LP	40	—	—	—	40	94	—	59	—	—
The Third Eye Centre	Released: 26 August 2013; Label: Rough Trade (RTRADCD670); Format: CD, DL, LP	44	—	174	—	—	71	—	—	—	145
How to Solve Our Human Problems	Released: February 2018; Label: Matador; Format: CD, DL, LP	28	37	—	27	—	72	29	—	27	—
"—" denotes a release that did not chart or was not released in that territory.

== Live albums ==
Title	Details	Peak chart positions	
Title	Details	UK	FRA
If You're Feeling Sinister: Live at the Barbican	Released: 6 December 2005; Label: Rough Trade (RTRADDA 301); Format: DL	—	—
The BBC Sessions	Released: 18 November 2008; Label: Jeepster (JPRCD018); Format: CD, DL, LP	88	126
Live 2015	Released: 22 May 2015; Label: Concert Live, Matador (CLCD473); Format: CD, DL	—	—
What to Look for in Summer	Released: 11 December 2020; Label: Matador; Format: CD, DL, 2xLP	—	—
"—" denotes a release that did not chart or was not released in that territory.

== Box sets ==
Title	Details	Peak chart positions
Title	Details	UK
Lazy Line Painter Jane	Released: 7 March 2000; Label: Jeepster (JPRBOX 001); Format: CD	122
The Jeepster Singles Collection	Released: 21 October 2016; Label: Jeepster (JPR12BOX1); Format: 12" vinyl+DVD, DL	—
"—" denotes a release that did not chart or was not released in that territory.

== EPs ==
Title	Details	Peak chart positions		
Title	Details	UK	IRE	SWE
Dog on Wheels	Released: 12 May 1997; Label: Jeepster (JPRCDS001); Format: CD, DL, 7" vinyl, 12" vinyl	59	—	—
Lazy Line Painter Jane	Released: 28 July 1997; Label: Jeepster (JPRCDS002); Format: CD, DL, 7" vinyl, 12" vinyl	41	—	—
3.. 6.. 9 Seconds of Light	Released: 13 October 1997; Label: Jeepster (JPRCDS003); Format: CD, DL, 7" vinyl, 12" vinyl	32	—	—
This Is Just a Modern Rock Song	Released: 7 December 1998; Label: Jeepster (JPRCDS 009); Format: CD, DL, 12" vinyl	—^{1}	—	45
Books	Released: 21 June 2004; Label: Rough Trade (RTRADSCD180); Format: CD, DL, DVD, 7" vinyl	20	46	—
Introducing... Belle & Sebastian	Released: 27 May 2008; Label: Jeepster; Format: DL	—	—	—
How to Solve Our Human Problems (Part 1)	Released: 8 December 2017; Label: Matador; Format: CD, DL, 12" vinyl	—	—	—
How to Solve Our Human Problems (Part 2)	Released: 19 January 2018; Label: Matador; Format: CD, DL, 12" vinyl	—	—	—
How to Solve Our Human Problems (Part 3)	Released: 16 February 2018; Label: Matador; Format: CD, DL, 12" vinyl	28	—	—
"—" denotes a release that did not chart or was not released in that territory.

^{1} Charted at number 1 on the UK Indie Chart.

== Singles ==
Title	Year	Peak chart positions										Album
Title	Year	UK	AUS	CAN	EUR	IRE	JPN	MEX	NED	NOR	SWE	Album
"Legal Man"	2000	15	—	4	—	50	—	—	—	10	46	Non-album singles
"Jonathan David"	2001	31	—	9	—	—	—	—	—	—	46	Non-album singles
"I'm Waking Up to Us"	2001	39	—	—	—	—	—	—	—	—	50	Non-album singles
"Step into My Office, Baby"	2003	32	—	—	—	—	—	—	80	—	—	Dear Catastrophe Waitress
"I'm a Cuckoo"	2004	14	—	—	—	—	—	—	—	—	59	Dear Catastrophe Waitress
"Funny Little Frog"	2006	13	—	—	—	32	—	—	—	—	—	The Life Pursuit
"Casaco Marrom"	2006	—	—	—	—	—	—	—	—	—	—	Late Night Tales: Belle & Sebastian
"The Blues Are Still Blue"	2006	25	43	—	81	—	—	—	—	—	—	The Life Pursuit
"White Collar Boy"	2006	45	—	—	—	—	—	—	—	—	—	The Life Pursuit
"Write About Love"	2010	—	—	—	—	—	—	17	—	—	—	Belle & Sebastian Write About Love
"I Want the World to Stop"	2011	125	—	—	—	—	—	—	—	—	—	Belle & Sebastian Write About Love
"Come on Sister"	2011	— (Note: "Come on Sister" charted at number 13 on the UK Physical Singles Chart.)	—	—	—	—	—	—	—	—	—	Belle & Sebastian Write About Love
"The Party Line"	2014	—	—	—	—	—	56	—	—	—	—	Girls in Peacetime Want to Dance
"Nobody's Empire"	2015	—	—	—	—	—	—	36	—	—	—	Girls in Peacetime Want to Dance
"The Cat with the Cream"	2015	—	—	—	—	—	—	—	—	—	—	Girls in Peacetime Want to Dance
"We Were Beautiful"	2017	—	—	—	—	—	—	—	—	—	—	How to Solve Our Human Problems
"Poor Boy"	2018	—	—	—	—	—	—	—	—	—	—	How to Solve Our Human Problems
"Sister Buddha"	2019	—	—	—	—	—	—	27	—	—	—	Days of the Bagnold Summer soundtrack
"Unnecessary Drama"	2022	—	—	—	—	—	—	—	—	—	—	A Bit of Previous
"If They're Shooting At You"	2022	—	—	—	—	—	—	—	—	—	—	A Bit of Previous
"Young and Stupid"	2022	—	—	—	—	—	—	—	—	—	—	A Bit of Previous
"A Bit of Previous"	2022	—	—	—	—	—	—	—	—	—	—	Non-album single
"I Don't Know What You See In Me"	2023	—	—	—	—	—	— (Note: "He Said She Said" did not enter the Billboard Japan Hot 100 chart, but peaked at number 18 on the Billboard Japan Hot Overseas chart.)	—	—	—	—	Late Developers
"It Only Takes One Lion"	2026	-	—	-	—	-	—	—	—	-	-	Non-album single
"—" denotes a release that did not chart or was not released in that territory.

== Other ==
Title	Album details
LateNightTales	By various artists; Compiled by Belle & Sebastian; Released: 27 February 2006; Label: Azuli; Format: CD, DL, LP
LateNightTales, Vol. II	By various artists; Compiled by Belle & Sebastian; Released: 26 March 2012; Label: Late Night Tales; Format: CD, DL

== Miscellaneous songs ==
- "O come, O come, Emmanuel" (traditional) on the Xfm charity compilation It's A Cool, Cool Christmas, released 20 November 2000 on Jeepster Records
- "Final Day" (Young Marble Giants cover) on the Rough Trade 25th-anniversary compilation Stop Me If You Think You've Heard This One Before, released 23 September 2003 on Rough Trade Records
- "Poupée de cire, poupée de son" (live France Gall cover) on the Fans Only DVD, released 20 October 2003 on Jeepster Records
- "Casaco Marron(sic)" (Trio Esperança cover) on the Belle & Sebastian-compiled album Late Night Tales: Belle & Sebastian, released on 27 February 2006 on Azuli Records, and as a limited-edition 7-inch vinyl single (backed with David Shrigley's spoken-word piece "When I Was a Little Girl") released 13 February 2006, also on Azuli
- "The Monkeys Are Breaking Out the Zoo", a children's song on the Save the Children charity album Colours Are Brighter, released 16 October 2006 on Rough Trade Records
- "Are You Coming Over For Christmas?", released December, 2007 on Belle and Sebastian's official website and Myspace profile.
- "Crash" (Primitives cover), released in 2012 as part of the Late Night Tales: Belle and Sebastian Vol. II compilation.

== DVDs ==
- Fans Only (2003)

== See also ==
- List of bands from Glasgow
- God Help the Girl
