= Introducing... Belle & Sebastian =

EP by Belle & Sebastian
- Released: 27 May 2008
- Length: 19:56
- Label: Jeepster Records

Belle & Sebastian chronology
White Collar Boy (2006)	Introducing... Belle & Sebastian (2008)

Introducing... Belle & Sebastian is an EP released by Belle & Sebastian in 2008 on Jeepster Records. The EP was compiled from the band's earlier material, ranging from their debut in 1996 to 2001.

== Track listing ==
1. "The Boy With the Arab Strap" - 5:16

- Originally appeared on The Boy with the Arab Strap in 1998

2. "Expectations" - 3:36

- Originally appeared on Tigermilk in 1996

3. "Get Me Away from Here I'm Dying" - 3:27

- Originally appeared on If You're Feeling Sinister in 1996

4. "Women's Realm" - 4:37

- Originally appeared on Fold Your Hands Child, You Walk Like a Peasant in 2000

5. "Jonathan David" - 3:00

- Originally released as Jonathan David in 2001
