= What to Look for in Summer =

Live album by Belle and Sebastian
- Released: 11 December 2020
- Recorded: 2019
- Venues: Royal Oak Theatre, Royal Oak, Michigan; Union Transfer, Philadelphia, Pennsylvania; House of Blues, Boston, Massachusetts; M-Telus, Montreal, Quebec; Carnegie Music Hall, Pittsburgh, Pennsylvania; House of Blues, Cleveland, Ohio; Auditorio Baluarte, Pamplona, Navarra
- Length: 99:41
- Label: Matador

Belle and Sebastian chronology
Days of the Bagnold Summer (2019)	What to Look for in Summer (2020)	A Bit of Previous (2022)

Professional ratings
Aggregate scores
Source	Rating
Metacritic	78/100
Review scores
Source	Rating
AllMusic	3.5/5 stars
Clash	8/10
The Independent	4/5 stars
The Irish Times	4/5 stars
Pitchfork	8.0/10
Uncut	7/10
Under the Radar	7/10

What to Look for in Summer is a double live album by Belle and Sebastian, released on 11 December 2020. The songs were culled from their 2019 world tour and Boaty Weekender tour.

== Background ==
The album was announced alongside the release of music videos for the live versions of "The Boy with the Arab Strap" and "My Wandering Days are Over" which appear on the album. The band took inspiration from progressive rock band Yes's Yessongs and hard rock band Thin Lizzy's Live and Dangerous; the initial title for the album was "Live and Meticulous", before bandleader Stuart Murdoch vetoed it, calling it "derivative".

== Track listing ==
Adapted from press release.

What to Look for in Summer track listing
No.	Title	Venue	Length
1.	"The Song of the Clyde"	Banchory Studios, Glasgow, 6 August 2020	0:33
2.	"Dirty Dream Number Two"	Boaty Weekender tour, 10 August 2019	3:30
3.	"Step Into My Office, Baby"	Boaty Weekender tour, 10 August 2019	4:43
4.	"We Were Beautiful"	Royal Oak Theatre, Royal Oak, Michigan, 21 July 2019	5:37
5.	"Seeing Other People"	Union Transfer, Philadelphia, PA, 12 July 2019	3:37
6.	"If She Wants Me"	Carnegie Music Hall, Pittsburgh, PA, 18 July 2019	4:55
7.	"Beyond the Sunrise"	House of Blues, Cleveland, OH, 19 July 2019	4:16
8.	"Wrapped Up in Books"	Royal Oak Theatre, Royal Oak, MI, 21 July 2019	3:26
9.	"Little Lou, Ugly Jack, Prophet John"	Auditoria Baluarte, Pamplona, Spain, 4 November 2019	5:15
10.	"Nice Day for a Sulk"	House of Blues, Boston, MA, 13 July 2019	2:30
11.	"I Can See Your Future"	Boaty Weekender tour, 10 August 2019	3:47
12.	"Funny Little Frog"	M-Telus, Montreal, QC, 15 July 2019	3:10
13.	"The Fox in the Snow"	Royal Oak Theatre, Royal Oak, MI, 21 July 2019	4:19
14.	"If You're Feeling Sinister"	Boaty Weekender tour, 10 August 2019	5:51
15.	"My Wandering Days are Over"	Boaty Weekender tour, 10 August 2019	5:54
16.	"The Wrong Girl"	House of Blues, Boston, MA, 13 July 2019	3:22
17.	"Stay Loose"	Union Transfer, Philadelphia, PA, 12 July 2019	6:30
18.	"The Boy Done Wrong Again"	House of Blues, Boston, MA, 13 July 2019	4:46
19.	"Poor Boy"	Union Transfer, Philadelphia, PA, 12 July 2019	3:55
20.	"Dog on Wheels"	Union Transfer, Philadelphia, PA, 12 July 2019	3:11
21.	"The Boy with the Arab Strap"	Royal Oak Theatre, Michigan, 21 July 2019	7:38
22.	"I Didn't See it Coming"	Royal Oak Theatre, Michigan, 21 July 2019	4:15
23.	"Belle and Sebastian"	House of Blues, Boston, MA, 13 July 2019	4:42
Total length:			99:41
