= Sinister =

Sinister commonly refers to:

- Evil
- Ominous

Sinister may also refer to:

== Left side ==
- Sinister, Latin for the direction "left"
- Sinister, in heraldry, is the bearer's true left side (viewers' right side) of an escutcheon or coat of arms; see dexter and sinister
  - Baton sinister, diminutive of the bend sinister
  - Bend sinister, heraldic charge in heraldry, sometimes used to imply ancestral illegitimacy; see bend (heraldry)
- Sinister hand, left-handedness
  - Relating to the Left-hand path

== People ==
- Sinister, a stagename of bassist Derrick Tribbett's

== Arts, entertainment, and media ==
=== Fictional characters ===
- Mister Sinister, Marvel Comics supervillain
- Simon Bar Sinister, villain on the Underdog cartoon show
- Sinister Emperor, a vulture character from the Malaysian animated series Chuck Chicken
- Sinister Six, Marvel Comics supervillain group
- Sinister Twelve, Marvel Comics supervillain group

=== Films ===
- Sinister (film), a 2012 supernatural horror film starring Ethan Hawke
- Sinister 2, a 2015 supernatural horror film starring James Ransone

=== Literature ===
- Bend Sinister (novel), novel by Vladimir Nabokov
- The Sinister Signpost, Hardy Boys novel by Franklin W. Dixon

=== Music ===
==== Albums ====
- Bend Sinister (album), album by the band The Fall
- If You're Feeling Sinister, album by the band Belle & Sebastian
- If You're Feeling Sinister: Live at the Barbican, live album by Belle & Sebastian
- Sinister Slaughter, album by the band Macabre
- The Sinister Urge (album), album by Rob Zombie

==== Other music ====
- Sinister (band), from the Netherlands
- Sinister Footwear, orchestral ballet by Frank Zappa in three movements

=== Other arts, entertainment, and media ===
- Sinister Dexter, comic book
- Spider-Man: Return of the Sinister Six, comic-related video game

== Other ==
- Sinister Peak, North Cascades mountains, Washington state, U.S.

== See also ==
- Sinestro, a supervillain appearing in American comic books
- Sinistar, a multi-directional shooter arcade game
- Sinistral, a scientific term
- Synyster Gates, guitarist
- The Sinister Minister (disambiguation)
