= Stuart David =

Scottish musician, songwriter and novelist

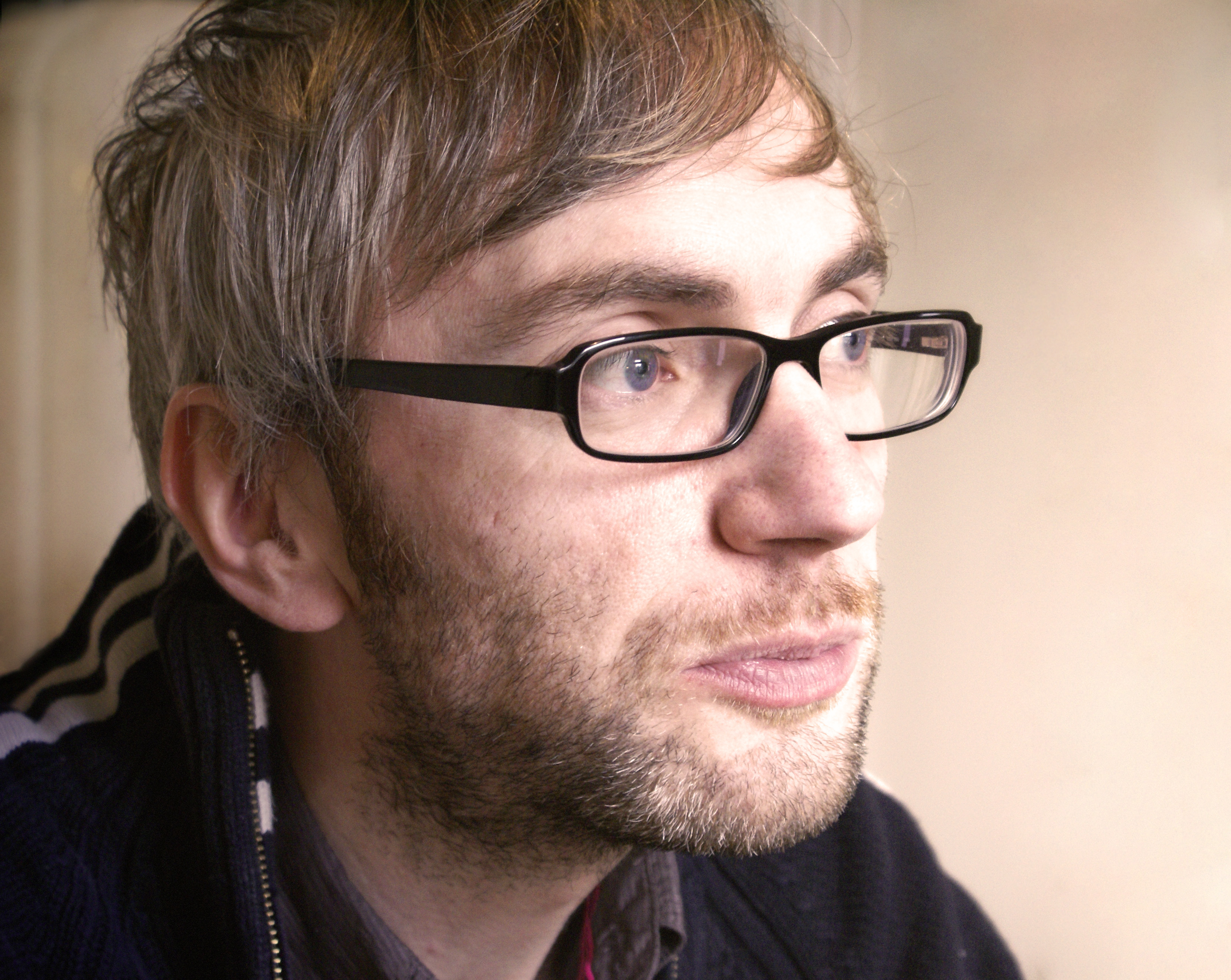
- David in 2010

Background information
- Born: Stuart David Black; 26 December 1969 (age 56)
- Origin: Alexandria, Dunbartonshire, Scotland
- Genres: Alternative rock, indie pop, spoken word
- Occupations: Musician, songwriter, novelist
- Instruments: Vocals, bass guitar, samplers, keyboards, synthesizer
- Years active: 1985–present
- Labels: Mute Records, SubPop, Jeepster

Stuart David (born 26 December 1969) is a Scottish musician, songwriter and novelist. He co-founded the band Belle and Sebastian and was a member from 1996 to 2000, and then went on to front Looper (1998–present). He has published seven novels – Nalda Said (IMP, 1999), The Peacock Manifesto (IMP, 2001), Peacock's Tale (Barcelona Review, 2011), Jackdaw & the Randoms (Hotkey, 2015), Peacock & The Poet (2016), Peacock's Alibi (Polygon, 2018), and Dying For A Dram (2021)– and one volume of memoir, In The All-Night Cafe (Little, Brown, 2015), chronicling the formation of Belle and Sebastian.

== Early life ==
David grew up in the small town of Alexandria, West Dunbartonshire, on the west coast of Scotland The son of a toolmaker, he had a traditionally working-class upbringing, attending The Vale of Leven Academy (1981–1987). He began writing songs at the age of 14, and started his first band a year later. In 1989 he attended a year-long course in Electronic Music Recording at Clydebank Technical College, writing his first two unpublished novels when the course ended (Francis' Point and The Bleach Field). In 1994 he joined a course for unemployed musicians in Glasgow called Beatbox, where he met Stuart Murdoch. Together they played in two early bands (Lisa Helps The Blind and Rhode Island) before forming Belle and Sebastian to make a single for the Stow College label Electric Honey. The planned single quickly became the album Tigermilk.

== Belle and Sebastian ==
David made four albums with Belle and Sebastian (Tigermilk, If You're Feeling Sinister, The Boy With The Arab Strap, and Fold Your Hands Child, You Walk Like a Peasant) and a series of four EPs (Dog on Wheels, Lazy Line Painter Jane, 3.. 6.. 9.. Seconds of Light, and This Is Just a Modern Rock Song). His main role throughout his period with the band was bass player, although he also performed electric and acoustic guitar, as well as piano and vocals on a number of tracks. He was responsible for establishing the band's initial web presence, building their first website in 1996, and he wrote the songs "Winter Wooskie", "A Space Boy Dream", "Paper Boat" and "A Century of Elvis". He also published two books documenting the band's early days: Ink Polaroids: Of Belle and Sebastian and Little Ink Movies: Of Belle and Sebastian in New York. He left Belle and Sebastian in 2000 to concentrate on his novels and the band Looper.

== Looper ==
Looper initially began as a side-project to Belle and Sebastian, a place for David to further explore the spoken-word style he had developed in the songs "A Century of Elvis" and "A Space Boy Dream". The first Looper release was on Subpop in 1998, a 7" vinyl containing two spoken word songs, "Impossible Things" and "Spaceboy Dream #3". To date, David has recorded six albums with Looper – Up A Tree (Subpop, 1999), The Geometrid (Subpop, 2000), The Snare (Mute, 2002), Offgrid:Offline (Mute, 2015), Quiet and Small (Mute, 2018), A Luminous Place (Mute, 2023) – and a series of three EPs, all of which mixed the original spoken-word style with more conventional pop songs and instrumentals. Mute released the entire back catalogue of Looper's recordings as a five CD boxset in 2015, entitled These Things, and a 25th Anniversary edition of Looper's debut album Up A Tree on vinyl and CD in 2024.

== Novels ==
=== Nalda Said ===
Nalda Said was David's first published novel. The story concerns the nameless son of a jewel thief, brought up by his aunt Nalda, who convinces the boy that he carries one of his father's hidden jewels inside his stomach. The fantasy-like narrative details his subsequent terror of and interaction with society, who he fears will discover his secret and steal his jewel. The book was originally published in the UK by IMP Fiction in 1999, and has since been translated into ten languages. It was described by Dana Kennedy of the New York Times as "At once riveting and sad...uncomfortably true to life". The Guardian added "Nalda Said is a stunning insight into reclusion, a sideways glance at conservatism and an allegory of the way the business world treats art...It's a fabulous novel."

=== The Peacock Manifesto ===
The Peacock Manifesto was originally published by IMP Fiction in 2001. It tells the story of Peacock Johnson and his journey across America. The character Peacock Johnson also appeared in Ian Rankin's novel A Question of Blood, after David won an auction for a fan to have a character named after themselves, with David entering under the 'Peacock Johnson' pseudonym.

Peacock Johnson returned in 2018 in David's novel Peacock's Alibi in which the protagonist is attempting to escape charges for several crimes he has not committed.
