= Parka (disambiguation) =

A parka is a type of coat.

Parka may also refer to:

- Parka (plant), Silurian plant genus
- Parka (band), a German indie rock band
- Parka (beaver), a girl mascot
- The Reaper (2013 film), a Mexican documentary film, originally released as La parka

== Wrestling ==
- La Parka (disambiguation), multiple people

== See also ==
- Parca (disambiguation)
