= Days of the Bagnold Summer =

Studio album / soundtrack by Belle and Sebastian
- Released: 13 September 2019
- Length: 42:45
- Label: Matador

Belle and Sebastian chronology
How to Solve Our Human Problems (2018)	Days of the Bagnold Summer (2019)	What to Look for in Summer (2020)

Professional ratings
Aggregate scores
Source	Rating
AnyDecentMusic?	6.5/10
Metacritic	68/100
Review scores
Source	Rating
AllMusic	3/5 stars
The Line of Best Fit	9/10
No Ripcord	7/10
Pitchfork	6.8/10
Under the Radar	6.5/10

Days of the Bagnold Summer is the tenth studio album by Scottish band Belle and Sebastian. Released on 13 September 2019 through Matador Records, it serves as a soundtrack for the 2020 film of the same name directed by Simon Bird.

The first single from the album, "Sister Buddha" was released on 1 July 2019. The second single "This Letter" was released on 5 September 2019.

The album contains 11 new songs (including “Safety Valve” written by Stuart Murdoch before Belle and Sebastian formed). The two other songs are rerecordings of :

- “I Know Where the Summer Goes” (This Is Just a Modern Rock Song EP — 1998)
- “Get Me Away From Here, I’m Dying” (If You're Feeling Sinister — 1996)

== Critical reception ==
Days of the Bagnold Summer was met with generally favourable reviews from critics. At Metacritic, which assigns a weighted average rating out of 100 to reviews from mainstream publications, this release received an average score of 68, based on 9 reviews.

== Track listing ==
No.	Title	Length
1.	"Sister Buddha (Intro)"	3:04
2.	"I Know Where the Summer Goes"	4:23
3.	"Did the Day Go Just Like You Wanted?"	3:08
4.	"Jill Pole"	3:03
5.	"I'll Keep It Inside"	2:00
6.	"Safety Valve"	2:56
7.	"The Colour's Gonna Run"	2:26
8.	"Another Day, Another Night"	1:30
9.	"Get Me Away From Here I'm Dying"	3:58
10.	"Wait and See What the Day Holds"	3:20
11.	"Sister Buddha"	4:08
12.	"This Letter"	3:26
13.	"We Were Never Glorious"	5:23
Total length:		42:45

== Charts ==
Chart	Peak position
Belgian Albums (Ultratop Flanders)	188
Scottish Albums (OCC)	14
Spanish Albums (PROMUSICAE)	48
UK Albums (OCC)	73
US Independent Albums (Billboard)	43
