= Live 2015 =

Live 2015 may refer to:

- Live 2015 (Belle and Sebastian album)
- Live 2015, album by Cinerama (band)
