= Parca =

Parca may refer to:

- personified destiny in Roman mythology, see Parcae
- another name for Partula, a Roman goddess of childbirth; see List of Roman birth and childhood deities
- Parca (moth), a moth genus established by Saalmüller in 1891
- Parca (wasp), an ichneumon wasp genus junior invalidly established by B.D. Wragge-Morley in 1913, but not yet renamed
- PACS Administrators Registry and Certification Association, a professional society that provides certification services for medical image archive and electronic medical records administrators and support professionals
- Parca is also the Spanish translation for the Grim Reaper

== See also ==
- Parka (disambiguation)
- La Parka (disambiguation)
