= Stevie Jackson =

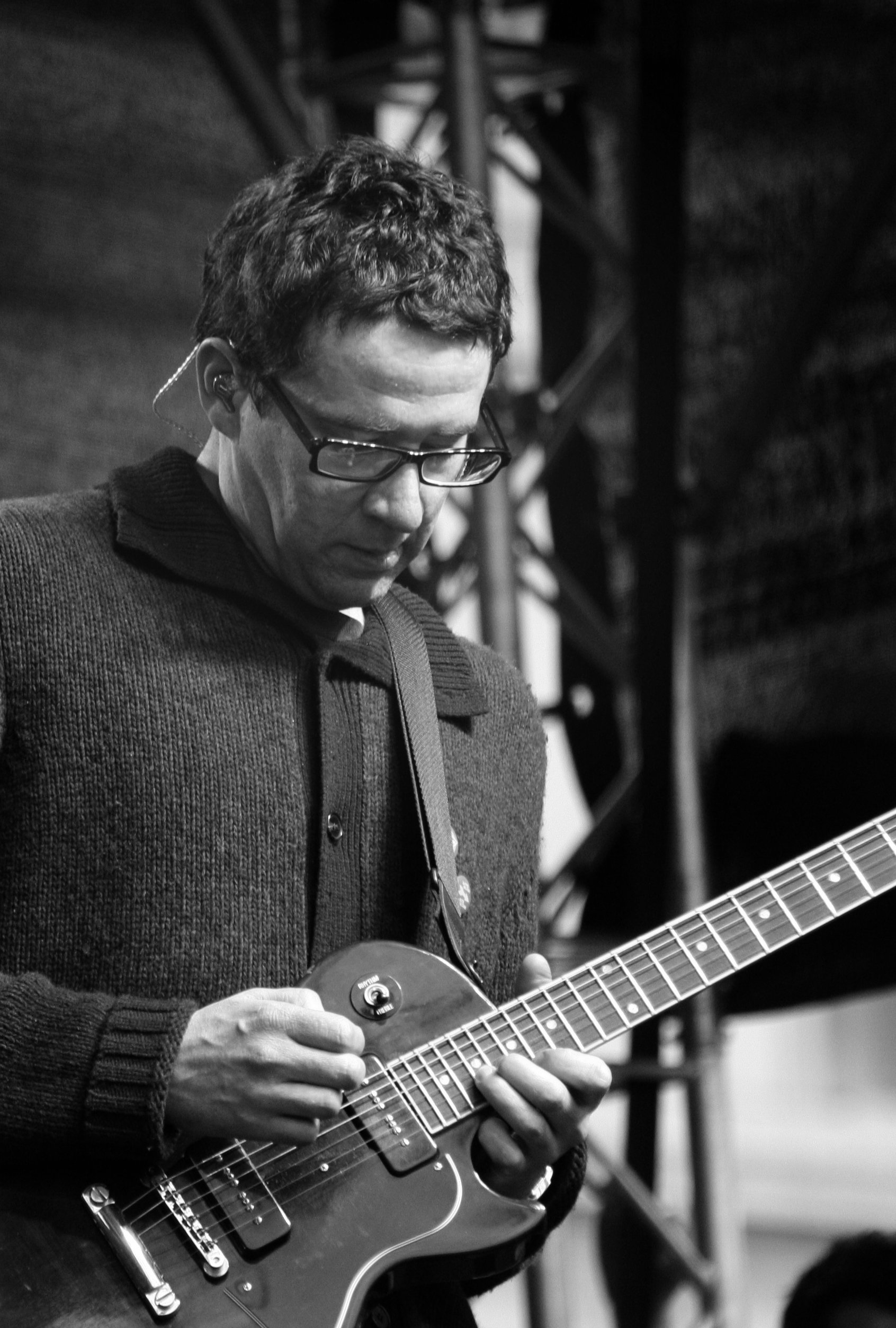
- Stevie Jackson playing guitar

Background information
- Also known as: Stevie Reverb; Action Jackson; Jacko
- Born: 16 January 1969 (age 57)
- Origin: Erskine, Renfrewshire, Scotland
- Genres: Indie pop
- Occupation: Musician
- Instruments: Guitar; Vocals; Harmonica
- Member of: Belle and Sebastian
- Formerly of: The Moondials, The Vaselines

Stephen Thomas Jackson (born 16 January 1969) is a Scottish musician and songwriter. He plays lead guitar and sings in the Glasgow-based indie band Belle and Sebastian.

== Career ==
Jackson's early musical influences include Madness, ABBA, Scorpions, OMD, Depeche Mode and ABC, with his first album purchase being The Police's Reggatta de Blanc (1979). Prior to joining Belle & Sebastian, he was a member of the Moondials, a band that released a single on Electric Honey, a label that would later issue Belle & Sebastian's first album, Tigermilk. The Moondials experience was a pleasant one for Jackson, and it took a great deal of work for nominal Belle & Sebastian frontman Stuart Murdoch to convince him to join his group. At the time, Murdoch was playing the open mic circuit in Glasgow as a solo act, and it was at one of these performances, at The Halt Bar, that Jackson first saw Murdoch play.

In the beginning, Belle & Sebastian existed mostly as an outlet for Murdoch's songwriting. Since the band's third album, The Boy with the Arab Strap, other members have begun to contribute, Jackson chief amongst them. All of the band's subsequent full-lengths have featured compositions by Jackson, and he wrote the band's 2001 single "Jonathan David" as well as "To Be Myself Completely" for 2006's The Life Pursuit.

In 2012 Jackson, accompanied by members of the Glasgow band The Wellgreen, recorded a version of George McCrae's "Rock Your Baby" for a fundraising cd titled "Super Hits of the Seventies" for US radio station WFMU. Jackson has undertaken several collaborative works with Roy Moller.

== Works ==
=== Belle & Sebastian songs written by Jackson ===
- "Seymour Stein" (from The Boy with the Arab Strap)
- "Chickfactor" (from The Boy with the Arab Strap)
- "Legal Man" (from "Legal Man" single)
- "The Wrong Girl" (from Fold Your Hands Child, You Walk Like a Peasant)
- "Jonathan David" (from "Jonathan David" single)
- "Wandering Alone" (from Storytelling)
- "Step into My Office, Baby" (from Dear Catastrophe Waitress) (co-writer with Stuart Murdoch)
- "Roy Walker" (from Dear Catastrophe Waitress)
- "I Believe in Travellin' Light" (from "I'm a Cuckoo" single)
- "Song for Sunshine" (from The Life Pursuit) (co-writer with Chris Geddes)
- "To Be Myself Completely" (from The Life Pursuit)
- "I Took a Long Hard Look" (from "Funny Little Frog" single)
- "Mr Richard" (from "The Blues are Still Blue" single)
- "Long Black Scarf" (from "White Collar Boy" single)
- "I'm Not Living in the Real World" (from Write About Love)
- "Last Trip" (Write About Love bonus track)
- "Perfect Couples" (from Girls in Peacetime Want to Dance) (co-writer with Geddes)
- "Sweet Dew Lee" (from How to Solve Our Human Problems - Part 1)
- "Cornflakes" (from How to Solve Our Human Problems - Part 2)
- "Deathbed of My Dreams" (from A Bit of Previous)
- "So in the Moment" (from Late Developers)

=== Solo discography ===
- (I can't get no) Stevie Jackson (October 2011)

=== Other projects ===
- contributed the song "Good Time" to the compilation Caroline Now!: The Songs of Brian Wilson and the Beach Boys
- played harmonica on "Song for the Troubadour" by the German band the Happy Couple
- played harmonica on "Thank You Baby" by V-Twin
- played lead guitar for the Vaselines for some tours
- co-wrote the song "Stoop Sale" on the I Blame You album by Michael Shelley
- plays guitar and sings on a few songs on the Too Many Movies album by Michael Shelley
