= Push Barman to Open Old Wounds =

Compilation album by Belle and Sebastian
- Released: 24 May 2005
- Recorded: 1995–2001
- Genre: Indie pop
- Length: 107:10
- Label: Jeepster
- Producer: Belle and Sebastian and Tony Doogan except where noted

Belle and Sebastian chronology
Dear Catastrophe Waitress (2003)	Push Barman to Open Old Wounds (2005)	If You're Feeling Sinister: Live at the Barbican (2005)

Push Barman to Open Old Wounds is a 2005 two-disc/triple-LP compilation released by Belle and Sebastian. Blender described the collection as "25 charming tales of shy girls dabbling in photography and bookish boys dabbling in shy girls."

== Content ==
The compilation contains the singles and EPs they released for Jeepster Records:

- Dog on Wheels (1997)
- Lazy Line Painter Jane (1997)
- 3.. 6.. 9 Seconds of Light (1997)
- This Is Just a Modern Rock Song (1998)
- "Legal Man" (2000)
- "Jonathan David" (2001)
- "I'm Waking Up to Us" (2001)

The track listing features every song on the aforementioned EPs, listed in chronological order.

== Critical reception ==
Professional ratings
Aggregate scores
Source	Rating
Metacritic	89/100
Review scores
Source	Rating
AllMusic	4.5/5 stars
Entertainment Weekly	A−
The Irish Times	4/5 stars
Mojo	4/5 stars
NME	8/10
Pitchfork	9.2/10
Q	3/5 stars
Rolling Stone	4/5 stars
The Times	4/5 stars
Uncut	4/5 stars

Push Barman to Open Old Wounds received widespread critical acclaim from contemporary music critics. At Metacritic, which assigns a normalized rating out of 100 to reviews from mainstream critics, the album received an average score of 89, based on 18 reviews, which indicates "universal acclaim".

Scott Plagenhoef of Pitchfork gave the album a very favorable review, stating, "The most beloved indie pop band since The Smiths, Belle and Sebastian are also probably the best. This collection would work like their own Hatful of Hollow and Louder Than Bombs were the first half not sadly missing their early BBC Sessions, and the second forced to omit their Dear Catastrophe Waitress singles and Peel Session tracks. As it stands, the first is a testament to the power and pull of one of the most singular and instantly lovable pop bands of our time; the second is a gentle suggestion that they took the correct post-mainstream fame steps after all, avoiding self-parody (see: Morrissey) and finding a way to be playful without becoming too precious (see: Lawrence in his post-Felt years). In combination, it's a perfect way into the world of Belle and Sebastian, even if the band spends the second half of the disc trying to redecorate that space."

== Track listing ==
Disc one
No.	Title	Length
1.	"Dog on Wheels"	3:11
2.	"The State I Am In"	4:59
3.	"String Bean Jean"	4:43
4.	"Belle and Sebastian"	4:36
5.	"Lazy Line Painter Jane"	5:49
6.	"You Made Me Forget My Dreams"	3:50
7.	"A Century of Elvis"	4:29
8.	"Photo Jenny"	3:14
9.	"A Century of Fakers"	4:29
10.	"Le Pastie de la Bourgeoisie"	3:10
11.	"Beautiful"	5:13
12.	"Put the Book Back on the Shelf"	6:24
Total length:		54:07

Disc two
No.	Title	Length
1.	"This Is Just a Modern Rock Song"	7:12
2.	"I Know Where the Summer Goes"	4:37
3.	"The Gate"	4:27
4.	"Slow Graffiti"	3:25
5.	"Legal Man"	2:42
6.	"Judy Is a Dick Slap"	4:05
7.	"Winter Wooskie"	2:41
8.	"Jonathan David"	2:59
9.	"Take Your Carriage Clock and Shove It"	3:35
10.	"The Loneliness of a Middle Distance Runner"	4:34
11.	"I'm Waking Up to Us" (Produced by Mike Hurst and Belle and Sebastian)	3:49
12.	"I Love My Car"	5:12
13.	"Marx and Engels"	3:45
Total length:		53:03
