= SixNationState =

English indie rock band

- Genres: Indie rock, alternative
- Years active: 2004–present
- Label: Jeepster Records
- Members: Gerry del-Guercio; Richard Hanson; Neil Higton; Alexei Roszkowiak

SixNationState (also known as Six Nation State or 6NS) is an English indie rock band formed in 2004 in Southampton, England (although the band have since relocated to Reading, Berkshire to strengthen links with London's music scene). The band is known for their low-budget music videos, often starring fans of the band.

== Career ==
Within the band's first year, they had performed 154 shows, played music festivals in Spain and supported Nine Black Alps and Babyshambles.

In 2007, the band performed at the SXSW festival in Austin, Texas and recorded sessions for BBC Radio 2's Dermot O'Leary and BBC 6 Music's Marc "Lard" Riley. In the autumn of 2007, the band hit the headlines after bassist John Maskell severed tendons in his left foot following his landing on a broken wine glass after crowdsurfing.

The band's debut album, SixNationState, was released in the UK on 24 September 2007 through Jeepster Records. Produced by Iain Gore, the record peaked at No. 16 on the UK Indie Chart. Within weeks, the album was on rotation on MTV Central.

On 27 June 2008, the band made their debut performance at Glastonbury Festival, playing at 'Cafe Tango'.

As of September 2008, the band were demoing tracks for their second album. This included working at Genesis' The Farm studio in Surrey. The band also performed at the Southsea Fest, finishing with a set at the Wedgewood Rooms.

The band took a break in 2009 after bassist John Maskell left.

In 2010 they regrouped as a four and have since demoed and recorded tracks for a new album (to be released 2011). The band's new song "You Really" was recently used in a Nike iPhone application advert.

== Discography ==
=== Singles ===
- "Keep Dancing" (Worst Case Scenario Records, March 2006)
- "Fire!" (Jeepster, 6 November 2006)
- "Where Are You Now?" (Jeepster, 26 March 2007)
- "We Could Be Happy" (Jeepster, 10 September 2007)

=== Albums ===
- SixNationState (Jeepster, 24 September 2007)
