= I'm Waking Up to Us =

2001 single by Belle and Sebastian

Single by Belle & Sebastian
- Released: 21 November 2001
- Length: 3:51
- Label: Jeepster
- Songwriter(s): Belle & Sebastian
- Producer(s): Mike Hurst, Belle & Sebastian

Belle & Sebastian singles chronology
"Jonathan David" (2001)	"I'm Waking Up to Us" (2001)	"Step into My Office, Baby" (2003)

"I'm Waking Up to Us" is a song by Belle & Sebastian, released as a single and extended play (EP) through Jeepster Records in November 2001. The track saw the band work with another producer besides usual collaborator Tony Doogan for the first time: Mike Hurst, former member of the Springfields and producer of Petula Clark and Cat Stevens.

The front cover features band member Sarah Martin and a beagle. All three tracks from the single were later collected on the Push Barman to Open Old Wounds compilation. The single reached number 39 on the UK singles chart and number 50 in Sweden. It was ranked number 73 in Pitchfork Media's "The Top 100 Singles of 2000–04".

== Reception ==
PopMatters said the song, "ushers in a certain level of maturity for Belle and Sebastian, both musically and thematically speaking, as if the group had come through to the other side of their daydreams and realized they weren’t always all they were cracked up to be. With rich strings and bold semi-orchestral elements like flute and harpsichord, the song found Belle and Sebastian playing with greater panache and spirit."

== Track listing ==
1. "I'm Waking Up to Us" – 3:51
2. "I Love My Car" – 5:14
3. "Marx and Engels" – 3:44

== Charts ==
Chart (2001)	Peak position
Scotland (OCC)	22
Sweden (Sverigetopplistan)	50
UK Singles (OCC)	39
UK Indie (OCC)	4

== Release history ==
Region	Date	Format(s)	Label(s)	Ref.
Japan	21 November 2001	CD	Jeepster	
Australia	26 November 2001	CD	Spunk	
United Kingdom	26 November 2001	7-inch vinyl; 12-inch vinyl; CD	Jeepster	
