= Legal Man =

2000 single by Belle and Sebastian

Single by Belle and Sebastian
- B-side: "Judy Is a Dick Slap"; "Winter Wooskie"
- Released: 16 May 2000
- Studio: CaVa (Glasgow, Scotland)
- Length: 2:42
- Label: Jeepster; Matador; Spunk
- Songwriters: Belle and Sebastian
- Producers: Tony Doogan; Belle and Sebastian

Belle and Sebastian singles chronology
"Legal Man" (2000)	"Jonathan David" (2001)

Music video
- "Legal Man" on YouTube

"Legal Man" is a song by Scottish indie pop band Belle and Sebastian, released as their first stand-alone single. The track features Isobel Campbell, Sarah Martin, and Rozanne Suarez (credited as the Maisonettes) on vocals and Snow Patrol drummer Jonny Quinn on congas. The cover artwork—designed by Andrew Symington—features band members Stevie Jackson and Campbell along with Adrienne Payne and Suarez. Two B-sides were released with the single: "Judy Is a Dick Slap" (an instrumental) and "Winter Wooskie", which was the last time bass player Stuart David sang lead vocals before departing the band in 2000.

"Legal Man" was released in May 2000, first in the United States on 16 May, then in the United Kingdom six days later. It reached number 15 on the UK Singles Chart, number 10 in Norway, number 46 in Sweden, and number 50 in Ireland. In Canada, the track reached number four on Nielsen SoundScan's Canadian Singles Chart. It is the band's highest-selling single in the United States. The song's music video was directed by Campbell.

== B-sides ==
"Judy Is a Dick Slap" is the first instrumental released by the band while "Winter Wooskie" is the third and final song featuring lead vocals from former bass player Stuart David, who left the band in 2000. All three tracks from the single were later collected on the Push Barman to Open Old Wounds compilation.

== Track listings ==
All songs were written by Belle and Sebastian.

CD single

1. "Legal Man"
2. "Judy Is a Dick Slap"
3. "Winter Wooskie"

7-inch single

A. "Legal Man"
B. "Winter Wooskie"

12-inch single

A. "Legal Man"
B. "Judy Is a Dick Slap"

== Credits and personnel ==
Credits are adapted from the UK 7-inch single sleeve and disc notes.

Studio

- Recorded at CaVa Studios (Glasgow, Scotland)

Personnel

- Belle and Sebastian – writing, production
- The Maisonettes – vocals
- Rozanne Suarez – vocals, cover star
- Jonny Quinn – congas
- Tony Doogan – production, recording
- Willie Deans – recording assistant
- Ian Grier – recording assistant
- Stevie Jackson – cover star
- Isobel Campbell – cover star
- Adrienne Payne – cover star
- Katrina House – back cover star
- Andrew Symington – cover design

== Charts ==
Weekly chart performance for "Legal Man"
Chart (2000)	Peak position
Canada (Nielsen SoundScan)	4
Europe (Eurochart Hot 100)	48
Ireland (IRMA)	50
Norway (VG-lista)	10
Scotland Singles (OCC)	9
Sweden (Sverigetopplistan)	46
UK Singles (OCC)	15
UK Indie (OCC)	4

== Release history ==
Release dates and formats for "Legal Man"
Region	Date	Format	Label	ID	Ref.
United States	16 May 2000	CD	Matador	OLE 448-2	
United States	16 May 2000	7-inch vinyl	Matador	OLE 448-7	
United States	16 May 2000	12-inch vinyl	Matador	OLE 448-1	
United Kingdom	22 May 2000	CD	Jeepster	JPRCDS 018	
United Kingdom	22 May 2000	7-inch vinyl	Jeepster	JPR7 018	
United Kingdom	22 May 2000	12-inch vinyl	Jeepster	JPR12 018	
Australia	10 July 2000	CD	Spunk	URA023	
Japan	9 August 2000	CD	Jeepster	VJCP-61041	
Brazil	2000	CD	Jeepster	T050/424-2	
Canada	2000	12-inch vinyl	Matador	OLE 448-1	
