= Lazy Line Painter Jane (boxset) =

Box set by Belle & Sebastian
- Released: 7 March 2000
- Label: Jeepster

Belle & Sebastian chronology
This Is Just a Modern Rock Song (1998)	Lazy Line Painter Jane (2000)	Fold Your Hands Child, You Walk Like a Peasant (2000)

Professional ratings
Review scores
Source	Rating
Allmusic	4.5/5 stars
Pitchfork	7.9/10

The Lazy Line Painter Jane box set was a re-release of Belle & Sebastian's 1997 EPs Dog on Wheels, Lazy Line Painter Jane and 3.. 6.. 9 Seconds of Light. The release contained original pressings of the CD versions of the three EPs in a card slipcase with new artwork. The slipcase was also available to purchase via the band's record label, Jeepster, for anyone who already owned the releases.

== Track listing ==
(all songs written by Belle & Sebastian)

=== Dog On Wheels (disc 1) ===
1. "Dog on Wheels"
2. "The State I Am In"
3. "String Bean Jean"
4. "Belle & Sebastian"

=== Lazy Line Painter Jane (disc 2) ===
1. "Lazy Line Painter Jane"
2. "You Made Me Forget My Dreams"
3. "Photo Jenny"
4. "A Century of Elvis"

=== 3.. 6.. 9 Seconds of Light (disc 3) ===
1. "A Century of Fakers"
2. "Le Pastie de la Bourgeoisie"
3. "Beautiful"
4. "Put the Book Back on the Shelf""
