= A Bit of Previous =

- One of four similarly themed covers issued for the album, with cover stars Titana Ntsoaki, Cass Kildea & Yvonne Kincaid

Studio album by Belle and Sebastian
- Released: 6 May 2022
- Length: 47:55
- Label: Matador
- Producers: Belle and Sebastian

Belle and Sebastian chronology
What to Look for in Summer (2020)	A Bit of Previous (2022)	Late Developers (2023)

Professional ratings
Aggregate scores
Source	Rating
Metacritic	78/100
Review scores
Source	Rating
AllMusic	4/5 stars
Clash	8/10
DIY	4/5 stars
Exclaim!	7/10
The Line of Best Fit	6/10
NME	4/5 stars
Pitchfork	7.5/10
PopMatters	6/10
Under the Radar	7/10 stars
Slant Magazine	3.5/5 stars

A Bit of Previous is the eleventh studio album by Scottish band Belle and Sebastian, released on 6 May 2022 through Matador Records. It was preceded by the singles "Unnecessary Drama", "If They're Shooting at You" and "Young and Stupid". A non-album single, also called "A Bit of Previous", was released in June 2022.

== Background ==
Belle and Sebastian intended to record A Bit of Previous in Los Angeles until the COVID-19 pandemic forced them to stay in their home city of Glasgow, making the album their first to be recorded there since 1999. The album title is a phrase used by the father of bassist Bobby Kildea to "winkingly acknowledge past relationships", although NME interpreted the title to be a reference to the Buddhist concept of reincarnation in that "you may already have 'previous' with people you meet".

== Critical reception ==
On review aggregator Metacritic, A Bit of Previous received a score of 78 out of 100 based on 16 critics' reviews, indicating "generally favorable" reception. Quinn Moreland, writing for Pitchfork, felt that the "lyrics share a tight thematic focus" characterised by Belle and Sebastian's "clear, aphoristic language", although musically, "A Bit of Previous touches on a little bit of everything". Gary Ryan of NME highlighted the "universally lovely melodies and earworm choruses" and concluded that "All of the well-worn Belle and Sebastian hallmarks are present, but what's truly impressive is how effortless it all sounds this time around." Steve Erickson characterised the album as an "endearingly self-aware nostalgia trip", summarising that it "strikes a balance between the band's familiar sound and proving they still have something to say".

Bella Fleming of The Line of Best Fit wrote that due to the circumstance of being recorded in Glasgow it at first appeared "set to be standout, yet ultimately misses the mark". Fleming judged that while "carrying the same overall feel of If You're Feeling Sinister and The Boy With the Arab Strap, it lacks the depth and storytelling brilliance that originally made this band so exciting". Reviewing the album for PopMatters, Hayden Merrick stated that from the first track, A Bit of Previous "refutes the assumption that this is a return-to-form album. [...] Even the album title [...] seems to admit that golden age Belle and Sebastian will have only a bit part in this new release." Merrick felt that the band still only have "some" of what they used to.

== Track listing ==
A Bit of Previous track listing
No.	Title	Length
1.	"Young and Stupid"	2:54
2.	"If They're Shooting at You"	4:31
3.	"Talk to Me, Talk to Me"	4:27
4.	"Reclaim the Night"	3:13
5.	"Do It for Your Country"	3:50
6.	"Prophets on Hold"	4:46
7.	"Unnecessary Drama"	4:16
8.	"Come on Home"	3:54
9.	"A World Without You"	3:03
10.	"Deathbed of My Dreams"	3:48
11.	"Sea of Sorrow"	4:58
12.	"Working Boy in New York City"	4:15
Total length:		47:55

Japanese edition bonus tracks
No.	Title	Length
13.	"A Bit of Previous"	3:49
14.	"Sometimes"	3:45
Total length:		55:36

== Charts ==
Chart performance for A Bit of Previous
Chart (2022)	Peak position
Austrian Albums (Ö3 Austria)	50
Belgian Albums (Ultratop Flanders)	85
Belgian Albums (Ultratop Wallonia)	162
German Albums (Offizielle Top 100)	31
Scottish Albums (Official Charts)	3
Spanish Albums (Promusicae)	27
Swiss Albums (Schweizer Hitparade)	31
UK Albums (Official Charts)	8
UK Independent Albums (Official Charts)	3
US Top Album Sales (Billboard)	15
