= Jeepster Records =

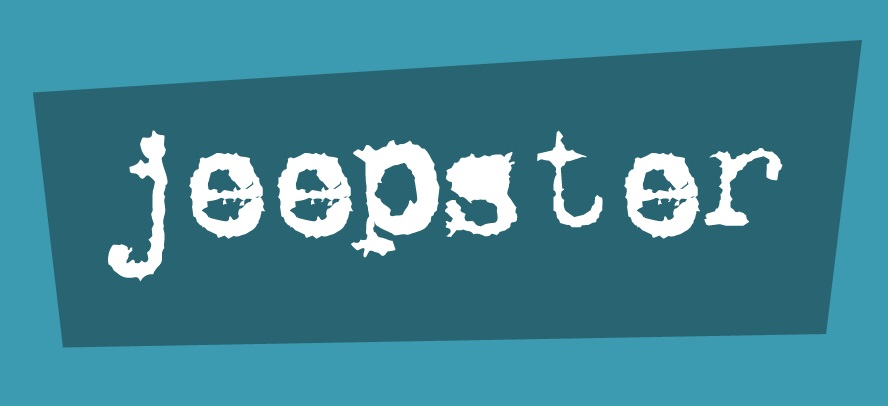
- Founded: 1995
- Founder: Stefano D'Andrea, Mark Jones
- Distributors: Republic of Music (physical), Believe (digital)
- Genre: Indie, alternative
- Country of origin: UK
- Location: London, England
- Official website: https://jeepster.co.uk/

Jeepster Records is an English, London-based independent record label, founded in 1995, and specializing in British indie and alternative bands, particularly Glasgow-based acts. It is most notable for its signing of Belle and Sebastian and Snow Patrol.

== Early success ==
Jeepster Records was founded in 1995 by Mark Jones and Stefano D’Andrea, through a mutual interest in the contemporary indie scene. Following their establishment and after extensive scouting, the label signed their first act, the newly formed Belle and Sebastian, in August 1996. In November of the same year, the band's first album with Jeepster, If You're Feeling Sinister was released. This established both Belle and Sebastian and Jeepster, and enabled them to release several EPs with Belle and Sebastian throughout 1997, as well as signing their second act, Snow Patrol, later in the year. 1998 then saw increased activity, with the signing of Salako, and the release of albums for all three of their signed bands; most notably Belle and Sebastian's The Boy With The Arab Strap.

The label's strong relationship with Belle and Sebastian enabled them in 1999 to sign Stuart David's side-project Looper, and Isobel Campbell's solo project The Gentle Waves, releasing albums for each that same year, along with a string of EPs and singles for their entire roster. The label enjoyed further good publicity when Belle and Sebastian won Best Newcomer in the 1999 Brit Awards. Later that year, Jeepster reissued Belle and Sebastian's debut album Tigermilk, which had previously been available only on limited issue vinyl.

2000 saw new albums released for Belle and Sebastian, Looper, and The Gentle Waves, as well as Belle and Sebastian's first appearance on Top of the Pops. In June of the same year, Belle and Sebastian had their first UK Top Ten hit with their fourth studio album, Fold Your Hands Child, You Walk Like a Peasant which entered the UK Album Charts at No.10, spending four weeks in the charts. Towards the end of the year, the label released the It's a Cool Cool Christmas compilation on CD in association with XFM, with proceeds going to The Big Issue charity. The album was only available during this Christmas period, and featured Belle and Sebastian and Snow Patrol, as well as numerous other bands including Grandaddy, The Flaming Lips and Teenage Fanclub. The following year marked the release of Snow Patrol's second album When It's All Over We Still Have To Clear Up which would later go gold, along with their debut album Songs For Polarbears.

== Dormant period ==
Despite critical acclaim for its acts, Jeepster was financially troubled by 2002 due to increasing recording and marketing costs, and an unsustainable reliance on one director for financial support. This forced the label to decline renewal of the contracts of their most successful artists and concentrate solely on marketing their existing catalogue. Stefano D'Andrea and Mark Jones resigned from the day to day running of the label, and Joanne D'Andrea took over management of the catalogue. While they were unable to retain their signed artists for ongoing releases and could not afford to sign new acts for this period, there were several additions to the back catalogue in the next few years.

The label released a Belle and Sebastian DVD in 2003, Fans Only, and in 2005 Push Barman to Open Old Wounds, a compilation comprising all of Belle and Sebastian's singles and EPs released under Jeepster. This was followed in 2006 by extended re-issues of Songs for Polarbears and When It's All Over We Still Have to Clear Up, which included all their B-sides as bonus tracks.

== Later releases ==
In a stronger financial position by April 2006, largely due to the commercial success of Snow Patrol on signing to a major label, Jeepster announced its first new signing in years, Reading-based act SixNationState. Following renewed scouting of the Glasgow underground scene, the label soon after announced the signing of another band, Parka, in November of the same year.

Following several singles releases by both bands, the label released its first new album in six and a half years in late 2007: SixNationState's self-titled debut album. In May 2008, Parka's own debut, Attack of the Hundred Yard Hardman was also released.

Before the end of 2008, Jeepster would release another Belle and Sebastian compilation, The BBC Sessions, collecting the tracks that the band had recorded for the BBC in 1996, which included rarities and unreleased songs, together with live recordings from Belfast.

Jeepster contributed six songs to the Polydor Records Snow Patrol compilation Up To Now in 2009.

In 2016, a limited release of 1200 vinyl box sets The Jeepster Singles Collection, containing all 12" versions of the early Belle and Sebastian EPs, together with original fanzines, press photo, DVD and scrapbook, was made available to celebrate the 21st Anniversary of the label.

Snow Patrol's When It's All Over We Still Have to Clear Up was again reissued in 2019 on limited vinyl, with a gold 7" containing two previously unreleased tracks.

In 2020, the Belle and Sebastian album If You're Feeling Sinister was listed in Rolling Stone's 500 Greatest Albums of All Time at No. 481.

The Jeepster charity album It's a Cool Cool Christmas was reissued for the first time on vinyl in 2021, in aid of War Child (charity) UK and with the blessing of all original artists.

== Discography ==
- If You're Feeling Sinister - Belle and Sebastian (1996)
- Dog On Wheels - Belle and Sebastian (1997)
- Lazy Line Painter Jane - Belle and Sebastian (1997)
- 3.. 6.. 9 Seconds of Light - Belle and Sebastian (1997)
- Little Hide - Snow Patrol (1998)
- One Hundred Things You Should Have Done In Bed - Snow Patrol (1998)
- Growing Up In The Night - Salako (1998)
- Re-Inventing Punctuation - Salako (1998)
- Songs for Polarbears - Snow Patrol (1998)
- The Boy with the Arab Strap - Belle and Sebastian (1998)
- Velocity Girl/Absolute Gravity - Snow Patrol (1998)
- The Moonlight Radiates A Purple Glow In His World - Salako (1998)
- This Is Just a Modern Rock Song - Belle and Sebastian (1998)
- Ballad Of Ray Suzuki - Looper (1999)
- Up a Tree - Looper (1999)
- Weathershow - The Gentle Waves (1999)
- The Green Fields of Foreverland - The Gentle Waves (Isobel Campbell) (1999)
- The Bird In The Bag - Salako (1999)
- Starfighter Pilot - Snow Patrol (1999)
- Tigermilk - Belle and Sebastian (1999)
- Musicality - Salako (1999)
- Mappleton Sands 20/12/98 - Salako (1999)
- Who's Afraid Of Y2K - Looper (1999)
- Mondo '77 - Looper (2000)
- Ventimiglia 12/08/99 - Salako (2000)
- The Geometrid - Looper (2000)
- Legal Man - Belle and Sebastian (2000)
- Fold Your Hands Child, You Walk Like a Peasant - Belle and Sebastian (2000)
- Falling from Grace - The Gentle Waves (2000)
- Ask Me How I Am - Snow Patrol (2000)
- Swansong for You - The Gentle Waves (Isobel Campbell) (2000)
- It's a Cool Cool Christmas (in support of The Big Issue) - Various Artists (2000)
- One Night Is Not Enough - Snow Patrol (2001)
- When It's All Over We Still Have To Clear Up - Snow Patrol (2001)
- Jonathan David - Belle and Sebastian (2001)
- I'm Waking Up To Us - Belle and Sebastian (2001)
- Storytelling - Belle and Sebastian (2002)
- Fans Only (DVD) - Belle and Sebastian (2003)
- Push Barman to Open Old Wounds - Belle and Sebastian (2005)
- Songs for Polarbears (CD reissue) - Snow Patrol (2006)
- When It's All Over We Still Have to Clear Up (CD reissue) - Snow Patrol (2006)
- Fire! - SixNationState (2006)
- Where Are You Now? - SixNationState (2007)
- If You Wanna? - Parka (2007)
- We Could Be Happy - SixNationState (2007)
- SixNationState - SixNationState (2007)
- Disco Dancer - Parka (2008)
- Better Anyway - Parka (2008)
- Attack Of The Hundred Yard Hardman - Parka (2008)
- The BBC Sessions - Belle and Sebastian (2008)
- The Jeepster Singles Collection - Belle and Sebastian (2016)
- When It's All Over We Still Have to Clear Up (vinyl reissue) - Snow Patrol (2019)
- It's a Cool Cool Christmas vinyl reissue in support of War Child (charity) - Various Artists (2021)

== See also ==
- List of independent UK record labels
- Lists of record labels
