= Jonathan David (song) =

2001 single by Belle and Sebastian

Single by Belle and Sebastian
- B-side: "Take Your Carriage Clock and Shove It"; "The Loneliness of a Middle Distance Runner"
- Released: 18 June 2001
- Length: 3:00
- Label: Jeepster; Matador; Spunk
- Songwriters: Isobel Campbell; Richard Colburn; Mick Cooke; Chris Geddes; Stevie Jackson; Sarah Martin; Stuart Murdoch
- Producers: Belle and Sebastian; Tony Doogan

Belle and Sebastian singles chronology
"Legal Man" (2000)	"Jonathan David" (2001)	"I'm Waking Up to Us" (2001)

"Jonathan David" is a song by Scottish indie pop band Belle and Sebastian. The song gets its name from the biblical duo of Jonathan and David, while B-side "The Loneliness of a Middle Distance Runner" is a reference to Alan Sillitoe's short story "The Loneliness of the Long Distance Runner." The front cover features band members Mick Cooke and Bobby Kildea with Gill Dodds. All three tracks from the single were later collected on the Push Barman to Open Old Wounds compilation. The title track was the band's first single to feature lead vocals from guitarist Stevie Jackson.

Upon its release on 18 June 2001, the single reached number nine in Canada, number 31 in the United Kingdom, and number 46 in Sweden.

== Reception ==
Online magazine PopMatters said the song "isn't just guitarist Stevie Jackson's most triumphant non-album contribution to the Belle and Sebastian canon, it might be the best example of what his songwriting is capable of. [It] impeccably blends in with his band's MO, with its dense '70s-ish melody and pitch-perfect orchestration. Thematically, it fits with Belle and Sebastian's underdog narrative too."

== Track listings ==
CD and 12-inch EP

1. "Jonathan David"
2. "Take Your Carriage Clock and Shove It"
3. "The Loneliness of a Middle Distance Runner"

7-inch single

A. "Jonathan David"
B. "The Loneliness of a Middle Distance Runner"

== Charts ==
=== Weekly charts ===
Chart (2001)	Peak position
Canada (Nielsen SoundScan)	9
Scottish Singles Sales (Official Charts)	16
Sweden (Sverigetopplistan)	46
UK Singles (Official Charts)	31
UK Indie (Official Charts)	3

=== Year-end charts ===
Chart (2001)	Position
Canada (Nielsen SoundScan)	71

== Release history ==
Region	Date	Format(s)	Label(s)	Ref.
United Kingdom	18 June 2001	7-inch vinyl; 12-inch vinyl; CD	Jeepster	
Japan	20 June 2001	CD	Jeepster	
Australia	25 June 2001	CD	Jeepster; Spunk	
