= If You're Feeling Sinister: Live at the Barbican =

Live album by Belle & Sebastian
- Released: 6 December 2005
- Recorded: 25 September 2005
- Genre: Chamber pop
- Length: 44:51
- Label: Rough Trade
- Producer: Belle & Sebastian

Belle & Sebastian chronology
Push Barman to Open Old Wounds (2005)	If You're Feeling Sinister: Live at the Barbican (2005)	The Life Pursuit (2006)

Professional ratings
Review scores
Source	Rating
Pitchfork Media	(9.1/10)

If You're Feeling Sinister: Live at the Barbican is a live album by Scottish pop group Belle & Sebastian. It features the performance of their 1996 album, If You're Feeling Sinister, in its entirety. It was recorded at the Barbican Arts Centre in London on 25 September 2005.

== Release ==
Having never been entirely satisfied with the production on the original release of If You're Feeling Sinister, Belle & Sebastian saw this live release as an opportunity to rectify their previous problems, enhancing the sound with clearer, more defined parts and a string section.

The album was released exclusively through iTunes Music Store, with the proceeds going to the DEC's "Asia Quake Appeal". The concert was one of a series organised by All Tomorrow's Parties in which artists performed their most popular albums in their entirety, known as Don't Look Back. The album has since been released on other online music stores, including Bleep.com and Karma Download.

Following the performance, the group continued with an hour-long encore of early non-album songs (as collected on the Push Barman to Open Old Wounds compilation) through to then-contemporary tracks. These do not form part of this album.

== Track listing ==
All tracks are written by Stuart Murdoch.

No.	Title	Length
1.	"The Stars of Track and Field"	5:02
2.	"Seeing Other People"	3:57
3.	"Me and the Major"	4:01
4.	"Like Dylan in the Movies"	4:25
5.	"The Fox in the Snow"	4:22
6.	"Get Me Away From Here, I’m Dying"	4:04
7.	"If You’re Feeling Sinister"	6:07
8.	"Mayfly"	3:50
9.	"The Boy Done Wrong Again"	4:22
10.	"Judy and the Dream of Horses"	4:49
Total length:		44:51
