= The Sinister Minister =

The Sinister Minister may refer to:

- "The Sinister Minister", a song and single by Béla Fleck and the Flecktones from their album, Béla Fleck and the Flecktones
- The Sinister Minister, a nickname of American professional wrestling manager Father James Mitchell
- Sinister Minister (horse), a horse, winner of the 2006 Blue Grass Stakes
