= La Parka (disambiguation) =

La Parka (born 1965) is a former ring name of Mexican professional wrestler Adolfo Margarito Tapia Ibarra, currently wrestling as L.A. Park.

La Parka may also refer to:

- La Parka (wrestler, born 1966) (died 2020), Mexican professional wrestler
- La Parka (wrestler, born 1999), Mexican professional wrestler
- El Hijo de L.A. Park (born 1988), Mexican professional wrestler
- L. A. Park Jr. (born 2000), Mexican professional wrestler

== See also ==
- Super Parka (born 1956), Mexican professional wrestler
- Parka (disambiguation)
