= Late Developers =

Studio album by Belle and Sebastian
- Released: 13 January 2023
- Studios: Banchory (Glasgow); Gorbals (Glasgow); Castle of Doom (Glasgow)
- Genres: Pop; indie pop
- Length: 42:01
- Label: Matador
- Producers: Belle and Sebastian; Brian McNeill; Kevin Burleigh; Matt Wiggins; Pete Ferguson; Shawn Everett; Tony Doogan

Belle and Sebastian chronology
A Bit of Previous (2022)	Late Developers (2023)

Singles from Late Developers
- 1. "I Don't Know What You See in Me" Released: 9 January 2023

Late Developers is the twelfth studio album by the Scottish indie pop band Belle and Sebastian, released on 13 January 2023 by Matador Records.

== Background ==
On 5 January 2023, the Scottish group posted a 10-second clip on their official website and social accounts, as an announcement teaser. A few days later, on 9 January 2023, Belle and Sebastian announced their new studio album Late Developers, along with the first single "I Don't Know What You See in Me". The official music video for the single was released on 11 January 2023.

== Critical reception ==
Professional ratings
Aggregate scores
Source	Rating
AnyDecentMusic?	7.5/10
Metacritic	79/100
Review scores
Source	Rating
AllMusic	4/5 stars
Clash	7/10
Exclaim!	7/10
The Line of Best Fit	7/10
MusicOMH	4/5 stars
The Observer	4/5 stars
Pitchfork	7.6/10
The Skinny	4/5 stars
The Telegraph	3/5 stars

Late Developers was met with "generally favorable" reviews from critics. At Metacritic, which assigns a weighted average rating out of 100 to reviews from mainstream publications, this release received an average score of 79, based on 15 reviews.

At Clash, writer Robin Murray described the album as a "fine piece of pop whimsy, delivered with self-deprecating panache."

== Track listing ==
All tracks are written by Stuart Murdoch, Stephen Jackson, Sarah Martin, Christopher Geddes, Richard Colburn, Robert Kildea, and David McGowan, except "I Don't Know What You See In Me" written by Pete Ferguson. All tracks are produced by Belle and Sebastian and Brian McNeill, except where noted.

Late Developers track listing
No.	Title	Producer(s)	Length
1.	"Juliet Naked"	Belle and Sebastian; Kevin Burleigh	3:22
2.	"Give a Little Time"		3:32
3.	"When We Were Very Young"		3:52
4.	"Will I Tell You a Secret"		2:15
5.	"So in the Moment"		3:23
6.	"The Evening Star"		4:25
7.	"When You're Not with Me"	Matt Wiggins	4:42
8.	"I Don't Know What You See in Me"	Pete Ferguson	3:39
9.	"Do You Follow"	Belle and Sebastian; Burleigh; Shawn Everett; Tony Doogan	4:19
10.	"When the Cynics Stare Back from the Wall"		4:21
11.	"Late Developers"		4:21
Total length:			42:01

Japanese bonus track
No.	Title	Length
12.	"I Dumped You First"	2:28
Total length:		44:29

== Personnel ==
Belle and Sebastian

- Stuart Murdoch – performance, costume design, photography
- Stevie Jackson – performance
- Sarah Martin – performance, props
- Chris Geddes – performance
- Richard Colburn – performance
- Bobby Kildea – performance
- David McGowan – performance (all tracks), brass arrangements (track 6)

Additional musicians

- Ryan Quigley – trumpet, flugelhorn (all tracks), brass arrangements (1–5, 7–11)
- Paul Towndrow – tenor saxophone, baritone saxophone
- Michael Owers – trombone, bass trombone
- Leon McCrary – backing vocals, vocal and choir arrangement
- Charles Henderson-McCrary – backing vocals, vocal and choir arrangement
- Anjolee Williams – backing vocals
- Olivia Walker – backing vocals
- Patience Henderson-McCrary – backing vocals
- Sarah Wilson – cello (4)
- Brian McNeill – keyboard programming (8)
- Pete Ferguson – vocals, keyboards (8)
- Kevin Burleigh – percussion (9)
- Tracyanne Campbell – vocals (10)

Technical

- Kevin Burleigh – mixing (tracks 1, ), engineering (1, 9)
- Brian McNeill – mixing, engineering (2–6, 9–11)
- Matt Wiggins – mixing, engineering (7)
- Kyle Startup – mixing (8)
- Frank Arkwright – mastering
- Pete Ferguson – engineering (8)
- Tony Doogan – engineering (9)

Visuals

- Emma Durnan – sleeve design
- Hristian Valev – cover model
- Marisa Privitera Murdoch – photography assistance

== Charts ==
Chart performance for Late Developers
Chart (2023)	Peak position
Portuguese Albums (AFP)	31
Scottish Albums (Official Charts)	4
Spanish Albums (Promusicae)	60
Swiss Albums (Schweizer Hitparade)	82
UK Albums (Official Charts)	30
UK Independent Albums (Official Charts)	3
