= The BBC Sessions (Belle and Sebastian album) =

Live album by Belle and Sebastian
- Released: 18 November 2008
- Recorded: 1996–2001
- Genre: Indie pop
- Label: Jeepster

Belle and Sebastian chronology
The Life Pursuit (2006)	The BBC Sessions (2008)	Write About Love (2010)

The BBC Sessions is an album by Belle and Sebastian. It is a double album. The first disc (Radio Sessions) is a compilation of unreleased recordings recorded between 1996 and 2001, while the second (Live in Belfast) is a live recording from a concert in Belfast on 21 December 2001. The live album contains covers of "Here Comes the Sun", "I'm Waiting for the Man" and "The Boys are Back in Town".

The tracks on the first album come from sessions with Mark Radcliffe, Steve Lamacq and John Peel. The album cover features former member Isobel Campbell, who departed the band six years before this album's release, but is heard on these recordings.

Professional ratings
Aggregate scores
Source	Rating
Metacritic	81/100
Review scores
Source	Rating
AllMusic	4/5 stars
The A.V. Club	B+
Drowned in Sound	8/10
Entertainment Weekly	B+
NME	9/10
Pitchfork	7.9/10
Q	4/5 stars
Rolling Stone	3.5/5 stars
Spin	3.5/5 stars
Uncut	4/5 stars

Disc One tracks 11-14 the John Peel session was the debut of these songs, and only studio versions of them.

== Track listing ==
Disc One – Radio Sessions:

1. "The State I Am In" (Mark Radcliffe Session; 07/96) – 4:42
2. "Like Dylan in the Movies" (Mark Radcliffe Session; 07/96) – 4:11
3. "Judy and the Dream of Horses" (Mark Radcliffe Session; 07/96) – 3:43
4. "The Stars of Track and Field" (Mark Radcliffe Session; 07/96) – 4:37
5. "I Could Be Dreaming" (Mark Radcliffe session; 12/96; abbreviated version) – 3:49
6. "Seymour Stein" (Evening Session; 07/97) – 4:51
7. "Lazy Jane" (alternate version of "Lazy Line Painter Jane") (Evening Session; 07/97) – 5:37
8. "Sleep the Clock Around" (Evening Session; 07/97) – 4:46
9. "Slow Graffiti" (Evening Session; 07/97) – 3:06
10. "Wrong Love" (later recorded as "The Wrong Girl") (Evening Session; 07/97) – 3:29
11. "Shoot the Sexual Athlete" (John Peel session; 05/01) – 3:11
12. "The Magic of a Kind Word" (John Peel session; 05/01) – 2:27
13. "Nothing in the Silence" (John Peel session; 05/01) – 3:49
14. "(My Girl's Got) Miraculous Technique" (John Peel session; 05/01) – 4:28

Disc Two – Live in Belfast:

1. "Here Comes the Sun" – 4:52
2. "There's Too Much Love" – 3:44
3. "The Magic of a Kind Word" – 2:24
4. "Me and the Major" – 5:19
5. "Wandering Alone" – 2:54
6. "The Model" – 4:02
7. "I'm Waiting for the Man" – 5:12
8. "The Boy With the Arab Strap" – 5:32
9. "The Wrong Girl" – 3:05
10. "Dirty Dream #2" – 3:26
11. "The Boys Are Back in Town" – 5:43
12. "Legal Man" – 4:01
