= Dog on Wheels =

EP by Belle & Sebastian
- Released: 12 May 1997
- Recorded: 1995 at Beatbox, Glasgow
- Genre: Indie pop
- Length: 17:26
- Label: Jeepster Records
- Producer: Belle & Sebastian

Belle & Sebastian chronology
If You're Feeling Sinister (1996)	Dog on Wheels (1997)	Lazy Line Painter Jane (1997)

Professional ratings
Review scores
Source	Rating
Allmusic	4/5 stars

Dog on Wheels is the debut EP by Belle & Sebastian, released in 1997 on Jeepster Records. The four recordings on the EP actually pre-date the band's début album Tigermilk, produced whilst bandmembers Stuart Murdoch and Stuart David were on the Beatbox music course at Stow College, Glasgow. Murdoch, David and Mick Cooke are the only long-term members to play on the songs, though Cooke only appears on the title track. The drums were supplied by David Campbell, whilst Brian Nugent played flute on "Belle & Sebastian", and Gerry Campbell, a tutor at Beatbox, provided keyboards on "The State I Am In" and "Belle & Sebastian" as well as lead guitar on "String Bean Jean". Other contributors to the E.P. include Mark McWhirter, Michael Angus and David Mackenzie, though their roles have not been confirmed.

The front cover features Joanne Kenney (who also appears on the cover of Tigermilk). The EP was later re-packaged as part of the Lazy Line Painter Jane box-set and all four tracks were collected on the Push Barman to Open Old Wounds compilation. The EP reached #59 in the UK singles chart. It was named Channel 4 teletext's music magazine Planet Sound's Single Of The Year 1997.

== Track listing ==
(all songs written by Stuart Murdoch, credited to Belle & Sebastian)

1. "Dog on Wheels" – 3:11
2. "The State I Am In" – 4:58
3. "String Bean Jean" – 4:42
4. "Belle & Sebastian" – 4:35

== Release details ==
- CD (JPRCDS001)
- 12" vinyl (JPR12001)
- 7" vinyl (JPR7001)
