= Fold Your Hands Child, You Walk Like a Peasant =

Studio album by Belle & Sebastian
- Released: 6 June 2000
- Recorded: CaVa Studios, Glasgow
- Genre: Chamber pop
- Length: 40:40
- Label: Jeepster
- Producer: Tony Doogan

Belle & Sebastian chronology
Lazy Line Painter Jane (2000)	Fold Your Hands Child, You Walk Like a Peasant (2000)	Storytelling (2002)

Fold Your Hands Child, You Walk Like a Peasant is the fourth album from the Scottish group Belle & Sebastian released in 2000.

== Background and recording ==
While promoting their third studio album The Boy with the Arab Strap (1998), Belle and Sebastian made their TV debut on 20 November 1999, appearing on Apocalypse Tube. Shortly afterwards, on New Year's Day 2000, they previewed songs that were set to appear on their next album.

Stuart Murdoch recalled that this album felt more difficult to make than prior albums. Musically the songs were more complex and "demanded a pop precision that you just couldn’t skirt around" requiring the group to practice and refine things more than they had traditionally.

The band introduced many stylistic changes on this album, such as an organic strings section and more songs with lead vocals by other members of the band; Sarah Martin sings on "Waiting for the Moon to Rise", Isobel Campbell sings on "Family Tree", and performs duets with Stevie Jackson on "Beyond the Sunrise" and Stuart Murdoch on "Women's Realm". Jackson also sings lead vocal on "The Wrong Girl" and duets with Murdoch on "The Model" and "Don't Leave the Light On Baby". It is the last Belle & Sebastian album to feature bass player Stuart David, who departed the band after the album's completion.

== Artwork and title ==
The twin sisters pictured on the cover are Icelandic musicians Gyða and Kristín Anna Valtýsdóttir, both from the band Múm.

Within the album's photography collection are pictures of two books, Beyond the Sunrise and I Fought in a War. Both books are titles of songs on the album, but the books are fictional creations of Murdoch's. Due to the band's interest in literature, fans have tried to locate the books that they believed had "inspired" the songs. Belle & Sebastian have informed fans about the fictive nature of the books on the "Questions and Answers" section of their website.

The album's title comes from a piece of graffiti on a public toilet wall Stuart Murdoch had seen years earlier and remembered.

== Reception ==
Professional ratings
Aggregate scores
Source	Rating
Metacritic	68/100
Review scores
Source	Rating
AllMusic	2.5/5 stars
Entertainment Weekly	B
The Guardian	3/5 stars
Los Angeles Times	3.5/4 stars
Melody Maker	3.5/5 stars
NME	8/10
Pitchfork	6.7/10
Rolling Stone	3.5/5 stars
Spin	8/10
Uncut	3/5 stars

The album was released to generally favourable reviews. Fold Your Hands Child, You Walk Like a Peasant debuted at No. 80 on The Billboard 200 and has sold 113,000 copies in the US, according to Nielsen SoundScan.

== Track listing ==
Fold Your Hands Child, You Walk Like a Peasant track listing
No.	Title	Lead vocals	Length
1.	"I Fought in a War"	Stuart Murdoch	4:10
2.	"The Model"	Murdoch	3:56
3.	"Beyond the Sunrise"	Stevie Jackson & Isobel Campbell	4:06
4.	"Waiting for the Moon to Rise"	Sarah Martin	3:13
5.	"Don't Leave the Light on Baby"	Murdoch with Campbell & Jackson	4:28
6.	"The Wrong Girl"	Jackson	3:20
7.	"The Chalet Lines"	Murdoch with Jackson	2:33
8.	"Nice Day for a Sulk"	Murdoch	2:30
9.	"Women's Realm"	Murdoch & Campbell	4:34
10.	"Family Tree"	Campbell	4:04
11.	"There's Too Much Love"	Murdoch	3:28
Total length:			40:40

== Charts ==
Chart performance for Fold Your Hands Child, You Walk Like a Peasant
Chart (2000)	Peak position
Australian Albums (ARIA)	53
French Albums (SNEP)	54
German Albums (Offizielle Top 100)	52
Irish Albums (IRMA)	25
Norwegian Albums (VG-lista)	17
Swedish Albums (Sverigetopplistan)	11
UK Albums (Official Charts)	10
US Billboard 200	80
US Independent Albums (Billboard)	3
