= Parka (band) =

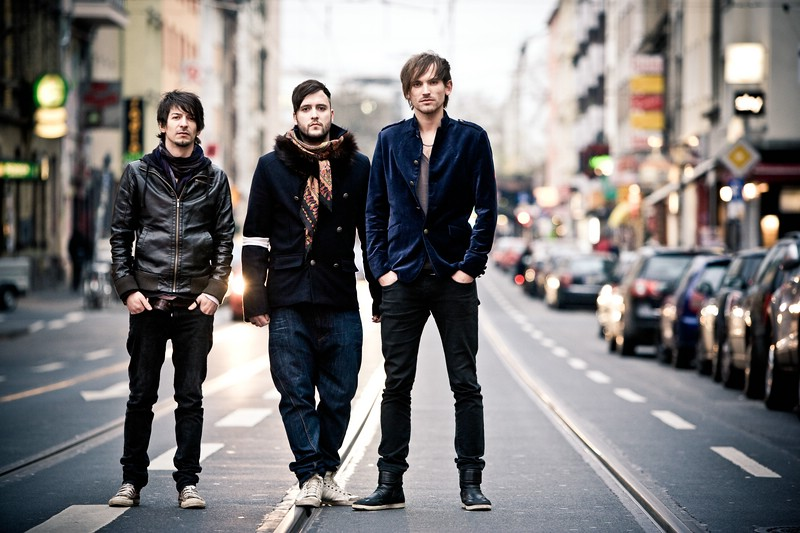
- Parka (2011)

Background information
- Origin: Germany
- Genres: Indie rock
- Years active: 2006-present
- Members: Martin Fliegenschmidt; Gianni Dedola; Raphael Sbrzesny
- Website: www.parka-online.de

Parka is a three person German indie rock band. It consists of Martin "Fly“ Fliegenschmidt (guitar, singer), Gianni Dedola (bass), and Raphael Sbrzesny (drums). The group has played with these members since the end of 2006. Their first live performance with this lineup was in the beginning of 2007.

== History ==
The three musicians from Köln, Neuss, and Stuttgart met each other in the late summer of 2006 at the University of Music and Theatre Hamburg and formed the band.

As early as 2007, shortly after the band formed, they won the German Rock and Pop Prize, the Deutscher Rock & Pop Musikverband's (German Rock & Pop Music Association) junior competition. In the period following, they recorded their first EP "Dein Leben beginnt" ("Your Life Begins") autonomously at Tinseltown Music in Köln and played over 150 live performances before they released their second EP "Granaten aus Licht" ("Grenades of Light") in 2009. Among other things, Parka played concerts with Silbermond, Revolverheld, and Die Happy.

In 2011 Parka played support for Die Happy during their tour through Germany and in autumn released their first single of the album "Oben" ("Above") as EP with two additional songs and the music video for Oben. The video clip premiered on 7 October 2011 on MyVideo. On 20 January 2012 the second single release, "Eins" ("One"), followed. The video clip reached over 70,000 viewers on MyVideo in one week and subsequently was included on television broadcaster ProSieben's website.

The self recorded and produced debut album "Raus" ("Out") was published on 24 February 2012; the single "Wieder ich" ("Me again") on 1 June. In addition, the band released the live DVD "Belagerung der Stadt Rottweil" ("Siege of the City Rottweil") on 28 September 2012, which was recorded in a historical brewery hall in Rottweil.

== Music ==
The singer and guitarist Martin Fliegenschmidt composed and wrote each of the band's songs. Parka plays to date music only in the German language, which they justify in their belief that one can say more between the lines in their native language, and that it's more important that people understand the lyrics than it is to reach many people. The band classifies themselves, based on statements, to "a generation, which wants to set political and social statements, but without the classic image of the enemy." In the text, the band generally takes on socially critical themes.

== Discography ==
- 2007: Dein Leben beginnt (EP, Self-distributed)
- 2009: Granaten aus Licht (EP, Tinseltown Records)
- 2011: Oben (Single/EP, Bullet Records)
- 2012: Raus (Album, Bullet Records)
- 2012: Wieder Ich (Single, Bullet Records)
- 2012: Belagerung der Stadt Rottweil (Live DVD)
