= Fans Only =

Video by Belle & Sebastian
- Released: 20 October 2003 (UK)
- Genre: Chamber pop

Fans Only is a rockumentary following the development of Belle & Sebastian during their time with Jeepster, from 'If You're Feeling Sinister’ to ‘Storytelling’. It features videos, live performances, interviews, out-takes, TV appearances, early documentary footage, exclusive material and behind the scenes insights into the evolution of the band. The front cover features band member Stuart Murdoch's wife, Marisa Privitera.

The Chicago Tribune commented that the DVD wasn't "discriminating" enough on the content it included, with large sections of the band "simply doing nothing". But that the video was helped by the "placating beauty of their music".

== Track listing ==
All songs written by Belle & Sebastian except where otherwise noted.

1. "Dog on Wheels"
2. "I Could Be Dreaming"
3. "A Century of Fakers"
4. "Like Dylan in the Movies"
5. "Lazy Line Painter Jane"
6. "Is It Wicked Not to Care?"
7. "The Boy with the Arab Strap"
8. "Poupée de cire, poupée de son" (Serge Gainsbourg)
9. "This Is Just a Modern Rock Song"
10. "Legal Man"
11. "The Wrong Girl"
12. "Wandering Alone"
13. "Jonathan David"
14. "I'm Waking Up to Us"
15. "The State I Am In"
