= Sarah Martin (musician) =

- Born: 12 February 1974 (age 52); Blackburn, England
- Genres: Indie pop
- Occupations: Instrumentalist, singer, songwriter
- Instruments: Violin, recorder, stylophone, melodica, guitar, flute

Sarah Martin (born 12 February 1974) is the violin player and one of the primary vocalists in the Scottish indie pop band Belle and Sebastian. Besides violin, Martin plays recorder, stylophone, melodica, guitar and flute. She joined the band right before the recording of If You're Feeling Sinister (1996). She was born in Blackburn, England.

== Belle & Sebastian songs written by Martin ==
- "Waiting for the Moon to Rise" (from Fold Your Hands Child, You Walk Like a Peasant)
- "Storytelling" (from Storytelling)
- "Scooby Driver" (from Storytelling)
- "Asleep on a Sunbeam" (from Dear Catastrophe Waitress)
- "Nothing in the Silence" (from The BBC Sessions)
- "I Didn't See It Coming" (from Belle and Sebastian Write About Love)
- "I Can See Your Future" (from Belle and Sebastian Write About Love)
- "The Power of Three" (from Girls in Peacetime Want to Dance)
- "The Book of You" (from Girls in Peacetime Want to Dance)
- "The Same Star" (from How to Solve Our Human Problems)
- "Give A Little Time" (from Late Developers)
