= Storytelling (Belle and Sebastian album) =

Studio album / soundtrack by Belle and Sebastian
- Released: 3 June 2002
- Genre: Indie pop
- Length: 34:45
- Label: Jeepster
- Producer: Tony Doogan

Belle and Sebastian chronology
Fold Your Hands Child, You Walk Like a Peasant (2000)	Storytelling (2002)	Dear Catastrophe Waitress (2003)

Professional ratings
Aggregate scores
Source	Rating
Metacritic	59/100
Review scores
Source	Rating
AllMusic	3/5 stars
Dotmusic	4/5 stars
The Guardian	3/5 stars
Mojo	3.5/5 stars
NME	7/10
Pitchfork	6.5/10
Q	3/5 stars
The Rolling Stone Album Guide	2/5 stars
The Times	3/5 stars
Uncut	3/10

Storytelling is the fifth studio album by Scottish indie pop band Belle and Sebastian. It is the score to the Todd Solondz movie Storytelling. Belle and Sebastian experienced many problems in communication with Solondz while scoring the film, and as such only about six minutes of their music was actually used in the movie. The album contains five tracks that are recorded dialogues. The instrumental track "Fuck This Shit" uses the prosody of the title phrase in a number of different keys but never the words themselves. The album was the band's final release on Jeepster, as they went on to sign a deal with Rough Trade the following year.

== Track listing ==
Storytelling track listing
No.	Title	Length
1.	"Fiction"	2:32
2.	"Freak"	2:19
3.	"Dialogue: Conan, Early Letterman"	0:26
4.	"Fuck This Shit"	2:31
5.	"Night Walk"	2:07
6.	"Dialogue: Jersey's Where It's At"	0:21
7.	"Black and White Unite"	3:54
8.	"Consuelo"	2:55
9.	"Dialogue: Toby"	0:33
10.	"Storytelling"	3:01
11.	"Dialogue: Class Rank"	0:12
12.	"I Don't Want to Play Football"	0:57
13.	"Consuelo Leaving"	2:29
14.	"Wandering Alone"	2:38
15.	"Dialogue: Mandingo Cliche"	1:19
16.	"Scooby Driver"	1:13
17.	"Fiction Reprise"	1:22
18.	"Big John Shaft"	3:55
Total length:		34:45

== Charts ==
Chart performance for Storytelling
Chart (2002)	Peak position
French Albums (SNEP)	55
German Albums (Offizielle Top 100)	99
Irish Albums (IRMA)	42
Norwegian Albums (VG-lista)	32
Swedish Albums (Sverigetopplistan)	29
UK Albums (Official Charts)	26
US Billboard 200	150
US Independent Albums (Billboard)	12
