= If You're Feeling Sinister =

Studio album by Belle and Sebastian
- Released: 18 November 1996
- Studio: CaVa, Glasgow
- Genre: Chamber pop; chamber folk; indie rock; indie pop; twee pop
- Length: 41:17
- Label: Jeepster
- Producer: Tony Doogan

Belle and Sebastian chronology
Tigermilk (1996)	If You're Feeling Sinister (1996)	Dog on Wheels (1997)

If You're Feeling Sinister is the second album by the Scottish indie pop band Belle and Sebastian. It was released in 1996 on Jeepster Records in the United Kingdom and in 1997 by Matador Records in the United States. It is often ranked among the best albums of the 1990s, including being ranked No. 14 in Pitchfork's list of "Top 100 Albums of the 1990s." In 2005, Belle and Sebastian released a live version, If You're Feeling Sinister: Live at the Barbican.

== Background and recording ==
Belle and Sebastian released their debut studio album Tigermilk in mid-1996 on local label Electric Honey. By July 1996, the band received praise by radio DJs, and by August 1996, they got attention from interested record labels. They ultimately signed with London-based label Jeepster Records.

Jeepster was willing to accept some of the group's other demands, such as releasing no singles, not doing press or promotional events, and not appearing in promotional materials.

At this point, frontman Stuart Murdoch and drummer Richard Colburn had taken up residence in a flat above Hyndland Parish Church in Glasgow, where Murdoch was a caretaker, with the band using the church's hall as their rehearsal space. They began rehearsing new material, written by Murdoch, after signing with Jeepster. The album took five days to record and three to mix, slightly longer than Tigermilk. It was recorded in the same studio as Tigermilk and engineer Tony Doogan worked with the band's previous engineer to maintain a similar recording style. Band member Sarah Martin, who had recently joined the band at this point, likened Tigermilk and If You're Feeling Sinister to the Beatles' albums Rubber Soul and Revolver in the sense that the two albums were recorded quickly after one another.

Author Dave Thompson, in his book Alternative Rock (2000), described the album's sound as: "Blessed with vocals straight out of Donovan's '60s, and a musical echo of vintage Boomtown Rats, topped off by a West coast vibe tinged with unbridled Scots romanticism". Spin thought the band sounded like a mix of Beat Happening and Tindersticks.

== Release ==
If You're Feeling Sinister was released in November 1996, which Belle and Sebastian promoted with shows alongside Tindersticks. It was issued in the United States in early 1997; the decision to do this delayed the follow-up, with the band instead opting to release three EPs, Dog on Wheels, Lazy Line Painter Jane, and 3.. 6.. 9 Seconds of Light (all 1997). The EPs were successively climbing the charts in the UK while If You're Feeling Sinister was gaining traction at American colleges. The band made their live debut in the US in September 1997, appearing at the CMJ Festival. The cover photo was taken by Murdoch of his friend, Ciara MacLaverty; like Murdoch, MacLaverty suffered from chronic fatigue syndrome.

== Critical reception and legacy ==
Professional ratings
Review scores
Source	Rating
AllMusic	5/5 stars
Chicago Tribune	4/4 stars
Entertainment Weekly	A
The Guardian	4/5 stars
Pitchfork	10/10
Q	4/5 stars
Rolling Stone	3.5/5 stars
The Rolling Stone Album Guide	5/5 stars
Spin	8/10
The Village Voice	A−

If You're Feeling Sinister received critical acclaim. Deeming Belle and Sebastian "uniquely gifted", Q reviewer Martin Aston highlighted Murdoch's "fluid melodies and wry, semi-comical lyrical outlook", saying that he had "built on Nick Drake's resourcefully gentle but deeply affecting blueprint" while eschewing "Drake's well-of-loneliness blues for something more chipper". The Guardian's Kathy Sweeney found the album's songs reminiscent of those of Drake and Love, remarking that "the tootly, acoustic strummery and gently ironic lyrics should make the most flint-hearted listener smile." "Fleshed out with subtle orchestral refinements," wrote Chicago Tribune critic Greg Kot, "Belle and Sebastian's folk-pop songs ingratiate themselves on first listen with their effortless, almost breezy melodies and sink deeper with each listen. The slightly fey vocals suggest a brooding delicacy, but on closer inspection also reveal a wit that is wickedly conversational." Similarly, Ana Marie Cox observed in Spin that the songs' "studied melodies" mask the "morbid complexity" of their lyrics.

In The Village Voice, Robert Christgau praised Belle and Sebastian's "popwise" qualities and grouped them "in the same general record-collector tradition as Orange Juice, Teenage Fanclub, and Bis," adding that "while younger folks debate the intellectual content of Stuart Murdoch's mild-mannered cynicism, for me his clever affect is there to test the strength of his third-power catchiness." Writing for Rolling Stone, Elisabeth Vincentelli felt that the group "do occasionally get mired in their own sensitivity", yet "it's tough to find fault with a band that opts for shy resolution over self-promotion and, in so doing, reaches peaks of effortless pastoral grandeur."

Retrospectively, AllMusic's Stephen Thomas Erlewine recalled that "If You're Feeling Sinister really did have quite a bit of an impact upon its release in 1996, largely because during the first half of the '90s the whimsy and preciousness that had been an integral part of alternative music was suppressed by grunge." He concluded that "Sinister plays like a great forgotten album, couched in '80s indie, '90s attitude, and '60s folk-pop. It's beautifully out of time, and even if other Belle & Sebastian albums sound like it, this is where they achieved a sense of grace." Pitchfork writer Elizabeth Nelson said that although Tigermilk was "by any measure a strong statement of purpose", "If You're Feeling Sinister was something else entirely—a streamlined juggernaut whose layered character studies were filled with exquisite literary and musical detail."

If You're Feeling Sinister placed eighth in The Village Voice's annual Pazz & Jop critics' poll for 1997. In 2003, Pitchfork ranked the record at number 14 on its list of the top 100 albums of the 1990s. Later, the website's readers voted the record as the 31st-greatest album released between 1996 and 2011. In 2010, If You're Feeling Sinister was listed as the 75th-best album of the 1990s by Rolling Stone, while Spin included the record at number 59 on its list of the "125 Best Albums of the Past 25 Years" in 2012. The record was ranked at number 481 in the 2020 edition of Rolling Stone's "500 Greatest Albums of All Time" list. If You're Feeling Sinister also appears as an entry in the book 1001 Albums You Must Hear Before You Die as chosen by music critics. Alternative music website Melophobe called it the sixth-best indie rock album of all time.

In 2007, as part of the 33⅓ series, Scott Plagenhoef wrote a book about the album. In February 2013, Pitchfork.tv released an hour-long documentary about the album directed by RJ Bentler. For the documentary, every band member who played on the album was interviewed. It featured archive photographs and videos from the band's early days.

Reflecting on it 20 years on, Stereogum's Tom Breihan claimed that Sinister could be "too influential", despite it taking "a long time for [the band's] influence to spread." In time, their impact would "fully sink into the bloodstream of the indie rock world." He saw the band's timidity taken, "Americanized", and introduced to a new audience in US college kids by American band Death Cab for Cutie. He also credited them with impacting the development of "sensitive and proudly bookish" indie stars like the Decemberists and Sufjan Stevens. Other groups that critics have noted Sinister inspiring include Alvvays, Hovvdy, Kings of Convenience, and the Shins.

== Track listing ==
All tracks are written by Stuart Murdoch.

If You're Feeling Sinister track listing
No.	Title	Length
1.	"The Stars of Track and Field"	4:48
2.	"Seeing Other People"	3:48
3.	"Me and the Major"	3:50
4.	"Like Dylan in the Movies"	4:15
5.	"The Fox in the Snow"	4:10
6.	"Get Me Away from Here, I'm Dying"	3:26
7.	"If You're Feeling Sinister"	5:20
8.	"Mayfly"	3:42
9.	"The Boy Done Wrong Again"	4:18
10.	"Judy and the Dream of Horses"	3:40
Total length:		41:17

== Personnel ==
- Stuart Murdoch – lead vocals, guitar, piano
- Stuart David – bass
- Isobel Campbell – cello, vocals, percussion, recorder
- Chris Geddes – keyboards, piano
- Richard Colburn – drums
- Stevie Jackson – guitar, vocals, harmonica
- Sarah Martin – violin, recorder, percussion
- Mick Cooke – trumpet (1, 6, 10)

== Charts ==
Chart performance for If You're Feeling Sinister
Chart (1996–1998)	Peak position
Norwegian Albums (VG-lista)	23
UK Albums (OCC)	191
