= Tigermilk =

Studio album by Belle and Sebastian
- Released: 6 June 1996
- Recorded: 4–6 March 1996
- Studios: CaVa, Glasgow
- Genres: Indie pop; chamber pop
- Length: 41:37
- Label: Electric Honey
- Producers: Belle and Sebastian; Gregor Reid

Belle and Sebastian chronology
Tigermilk (1996)	If You're Feeling Sinister (1996)

Tigermilk is the 1996 debut studio album from Scottish pop group Belle and Sebastian. Originally given a limited release of 1,000 copies by Electric Honey, the album was subsequently re-released in 1999 by Jeepster Records.

According to a 2026 interview with Stuart Murdoch, the album is named to match the album's cover photo and his experience eating Tiger's Milk nutritional bars while battling chronic fatigue syndrome. The album shares a name with an instrumental that was not included on the initial album but later performed on Belle and Sebastian's early tours. All of the songs on the album were written by Stuart Murdoch between 1993 and 1996, and originally performed solo on the Glasgow open mic circuit. Though he performs on the album, trumpet player Mick Cooke was not then an official member of the band.

== Recording and production ==
In 1994, Stuart Murdoch and Stuart David met on a programme for unemployed musicians called Beatbox, funded by Stow College in Glasgow, Scotland. David offered to play bass on Murdoch's demos despite having little experience with the instrument. The recordings caught the attention of Richard Colburn, who shared a flat with David at the time and was attending a music business course at Stow, run by Alan Rankine of the Associates. The end goal of the course was to take two songs from the class and record and release them through the college's in-house record label Electric Honey. Colburn provided a demo tape Murdoch and David had recorded titled Rhode Island (later released as the Dog on Wheels EP). The college was extremely impressed and chose to support Murdoch's goal in creating a full album as opposed to a single.

In early 1996, Murdoch and David reportedly enlisted the first four musicians they came across at the city's Grosvenor Café to play on the record, settling on a line-up of Murdoch, David, guitarist Stevie Jackson, drummer Richard Colburn, keyboardist Chris Geddes, and cellist Isobel Campbell. Their initial performances took places at venues such as church crypts, libraries, and house parties. Murdoch recalls that the group was still quite loose knit at the time Tigermilk was recorded and that the full ensemble had not played together before getting into the studio. Many of the supporting instrument parts were shaped as the group recorded. After recording, though, "we were a group, no question." The band subsequently spent three days recording, finishing with an album's worth of songs.

== Composition ==
Author Dave Thompson, in his book Alternative Rock (2000), called Tigermilk a "gentle masterpiece, utterly in debt to Nick Drake (and a bit of Donovan too)". He said "The State I Am In", the album's opening track, "buoys the occasional sag; that and the slickly loose instrumentation, harmonies which haunt the fringe of fear, and a wealth of emotionally crippled reflection." Nine of the ten songs featured on the album were recorded live over a three-day period, followed by two days of mixing. The only track not recorded during these sessions, "Electronic Renaissance", originated as a demo Murdoch made at Beatbox using Cubase, and was mastered directly from a cassette recording Murdoch had made of the song being played on a local radio station, hence its lo-fidelity sound. Due to its stylistic difference from the other songs, its inclusion on the album initially proved controversial.

== Release ==
Electric Honey issued Tigermilk in mid-1996, initially limited to 1,000 copies, which sold out in months. The band received praise from BBC radio DJs John Peel and Mark Radcliffe, subsequently earning them a radio session for the latter DJ in July 1996. Colburn said "then record companies and fans started calling, and we thought 'My God, what have we done?'" They soon signed to the London-based label Jeepster Records. Tigermilk was reissued in 1999; by this point, copies of the original were being sold for $600.

The album's cover photograph was taken by Murdoch and features his then-girlfriend Joanne Kenney. Kenney also appeared on the cover of the Dog on Wheels EP.

== Legacy ==
Professional ratings
Review scores
Source	Rating
AllMusic	5/5 stars
The Guardian	3/5 stars
NME	8/10
Pitchfork	8.4/10 (1999); 8.5/10 (2020)
Q	4/5 stars
Rolling Stone	3/5 stars
The Rolling Stone Album Guide	4/5 stars
The Times	9/10
Uncut	4/5 stars
The Village Voice	A−

Tigermilk was well-received upon its initial release, and earned a glowing review from Scottish culture magazine The List, who gave the band their first national press. The album has since sold over 124,000 copies. Pitchfork included "The State I Am In" at number 17 on their Top 200 Tracks of the 1990s.

An eBay charity auction of the stuffed animal in the cover art of the Tigermilk album in 2019 was won by Lisa Carr of Washington, DC. Lisa Carr had also previously won an auction for bandleader Stuart Murdoch's car in 2002 and an auction of the stuffed animal on the cover of Dog on Wheels in 2004.

== Track listing ==
All tracks are written by Stuart Murdoch.

No.	Title	Length
1.	"The State I Am In"	4:57
2.	"Expectations"	3:34
3.	"She's Losing It"	2:22
4.	"You're Just a Baby"	3:40
5.	"Electronic Renaissance"	4:50
6.	"I Could Be Dreaming"	5:56
7.	"We Rule the School"	3:27
8.	"My Wandering Days Are Over"	5:25
9.	"I Don't Love Anyone"	3:56
10.	"Mary Jo"	3:30
Total length:		41:37

== Personnel ==
- Stuart Murdoch – vocals, guitar, programming on "Electronic Renaissance"
- Stuart David – bass
- Isobel Campbell – cello
- Chris Geddes – keyboards, piano
- Richard Colburn – drums
- Stevie Jackson – guitar
- Mick Cooke – trumpet
- Joe Togher – violin
- Kenneth Humme - flute
- Keith Jones – Korg Poly-61 synthesizer, sound manipulation on "Electronic Renaissance"
