= 3.. 6.. 9 Seconds of Light =

EP by Belle & Sebastian
- Released: 13 October 1997
- Length: 19:17
- Label: Jeepster
- Producers: Tony Doogan; Belle & Sebastian

Belle & Sebastian chronology
Lazy Line Painter Jane (1997)	3.. 6.. 9 Seconds of Light (1997)	The Boy with the Arab Strap (1998)

Professional ratings
Review scores
Source	Rating
Allmusic	4/5 stars

3.. 6.. 9 Seconds of Light was Belle & Sebastian's third EP, released in 1997 on Jeepster Records. The lead track on the EP, "A Century of Fakers," uses the same backing track as "A Century of Elvis" from Lazy Line Painter Jane. Another song, "Songs for Children" (sometimes known as "On the Radio") plays directly after "Put the Book Back on the Shelf" (on the same track) on both the CD and 12" versions of this release. The front cover features band member Stuart Murdoch with Victoria Morton. The EP was later re-packaged as part of the Lazy Line Painter Jane box-set, and all four tracks were collected on the Push Barman to Open Old Wounds compilation. Both NME and Melody Maker made the release their Single of the Week, and the EP became the band's first to reach the UK top 40 singles chart, peaking at #32.

== Track listing ==
Source: Jeepster Records, Belle & Sebastian Official Site

All tracks are written by Belle & Sebastian.

No.	Title	Length
1.	"A Century of Fakers"	4:30
2.	"Le Pastie de la Bourgeoisie"	3:10
3.	"Beautiful"	5:13
4.	"Put the Book Back on the Shelf'"	6:24

== Release details ==
- CD (JPRCDS003)
- 12" vinyl (JPR12003)
- 7" vinyl (JPR7003)
