= Lazy Line Painter Jane =

EP by Belle & Sebastian
- Released: 28 July 1997
- Genre: Indie pop
- Length: 17:26
- Label: Jeepster
- Producers: Tony Doogan; Belle & Sebastian

Belle & Sebastian chronology
Dog on Wheels (1997)	Lazy Line Painter Jane (1997)	3.. 6.. 9 Seconds of Light (1997)

Professional ratings
Review scores
Source	Rating
Allmusic	4/5 stars

Lazy Line Painter Jane was Belle & Sebastian's second EP, released in 1997 on Jeepster Records. The title track features guest vocalist Monica Queen and was recorded at their usual rehearsal space, a rented hall in Glasgow's Hyndland Parish Church. "A Century of Elvis" features bassist Stuart David reading out a story he had written, over music by the band. The backing music from that track was later used on "A Century of Fakers" from 3.. 6.. 9 Seconds of Light. The front cover features Thea Martin holding Reason and Reality: The Relationship Between Science and Theology by John Polkinghorne. The EP was later re-packaged as part of the Lazy Line Painter Jane box-set, and all four tracks were collected on the Push Barman to Open Old Wounds compilation. The EP narrowly missed out on a top 40 placing in the UK singles chart, reaching #41.

== Reception ==
Reviewing the title track, PopMatters said, "There’s really nothing like the sinister tone of “Lazy Line Painter Jane” anywhere else in the Belle and Sebastian catalog, which came as even more of a surprise when it appeared early in the group’s discography. The darker mood of the song, its throbbing bass, proving they could be a full-on, locked-in rock band with chops and an intuitive feel."

== Track listing ==
All tracks are written by Belle & Sebastian.

No.	Title	Length
1.	"Lazy Line Painter Jane"	5:50
2.	"You Made Me Forget My Dreams"	3:52
3.	"Photo Jenny"	3:15
4.	"A Century of Elvis"	4:29

== Release details ==
- CD (JPRCDS002)
- 12" vinyl (JPR12002)
- 7" vinyl (JPR7002)
