= This Is Just a Modern Rock Song =

EP by Belle & Sebastian
- Released: 7 December 1998
- Length: 19:57
- Label: Jeepster
- Producer: Tony Doogan; Belle & Sebastian

Belle & Sebastian chronology
The Boy with the Arab Strap (1998)	This Is Just a Modern Rock Song (1998)	Lazy Line Painter Jane (2000)

Professional ratings
Review scores
Source	Rating
Allmusic	3.5/5 stars

This Is Just a Modern Rock Song is Belle & Sebastian's fourth EP, released in 1998 on Jeepster Records. The front cover features Alan Horne, founder of Postcard Records. It is the only Belle & Sebastian release never to be issued in North America, although all four tracks from the EP were later collected on the Push Barman to Open Old Wounds compilation. A chart ruling was put into place shortly before the EP was released stating singles or EPs must contain no more than three tracks and last no longer than 20 minutes in total to be eligible for the UK singles sales chart, and thus – with its four tracks and carefully crafted total running time – This Is Just a Modern Rock Song failed to chart.

"Slow Graffiti" was written for the soundtrack of the film The Acid House based on the Irvine Welsh novel of the same name.

== Reception ==
Reviewing the title track, PopMatters said the song, "gave a rare look inside the band or at least some kind of semi-fictionalized version of it. Regardless of the verisimilitude of the sketches, what was important was that these 'four boys in our corduroys' became characters as vivid and endearing as the ones they wrote about. So maybe B&S was being disingenuously self-effacing by claiming that 'We’re not terrific but we’re competent'."

== Track listing ==
(all songs written by Belle & Sebastian)

1. "This Is Just a Modern Rock Song" – 7:17
2. "I Know Where the Summer Goes" – 4:45
3. "The Gate" – 4:31
4. "Slow Graffiti" – 3:24

== Release details ==
- CD (JPRCDS009)
- 12" vinyl (JPR12009)
