= The Boy with the Arab Strap =

Studio album by Belle & Sebastian
- Released: 7 September 1998
- Studios: CaVa Studios, Glasgow
- Genres: Chamber pop; folk-pop
- Length: 45:27
- Label: Jeepster / Matador (USA)
- Producer: Tony Doogan

Belle & Sebastian chronology
3.. 6.. 9 Seconds of Light (1997)	The Boy with the Arab Strap (1998)	This Is Just a Modern Rock Song (1998)

The Boy with the Arab Strap is the third studio album by Scottish indie pop band Belle & Sebastian, released in 1998 through Jeepster Records.

== Background and recording ==
Belle and Sebastian released their second studio album If You're Feeling Sinister in November 1996, two months after signing to London-based label Jeepster Records. It was issued in the United States in early 1997; the decision to do so delayed the follow-up, with the band instead opting to release a trio of EPs – Dog on Wheels, Lazy Line Painter Jane, and 3.. 6.. 9 Seconds of Light (all released in The EPs were successively climbing the UK chart while If You're Feeling Sinister was gaining traction at colleges in the US; the band performed in America for the first time at the CMJ Festival in late 1997.

Stuart Murdoch recalled that the recording process for this album felt very different from the previous two. The group spent several months working on it versus the previous albums, which were recorded in just a number of days. The music itself was somewhat more experimental as well as more collaborative, with some tracks written by Stevie Jackson and Isobel Campbell and more members of the group contributing vocals. Stevie Jackson sings lead on both "Seymour Stein" and "Chickfactor", Stuart David gives a spoken word performance on "A Space Boy Dream", whilst Isobel Campbell sings lead on "Is It Wicked Not to Care?" and duets with Murdoch on "Sleep the Clock Around".

The inspiration for the album's name came from the band Arab Strap, who, like Belle and Sebastian, are Scottish and had briefly toured with them. An Arab strap is a sexual device for retaining an erection, a fact unknown to Murdoch at the time. Arab Strap were reportedly less than pleased with their inclusion in the title of the album. When questioned about it, Arab Strap's leader/singer, Aidan Moffat, said, "They have a sense of humour." Malcolm Middleton, the band's instrumentalist, added, "Because Arab Strap is quite an interesting name. The words go well together. That's why we chose it as a band name. We're friends with them, but there's a limit to putting someone else's name on an album. They're taking away something from us." He also mentioned that the album had been confused as a collaboration between the bands.

== Release ==
On 20 November 1999, the band made their TV debut, appearing on Apocalypse Tube.

The album's cover photo was taken by Murdoch and shows band member Chris Geddes. The photo was taken as the group spent an afternoon near the River Ayr near Auchencruive.

== Reception ==
Professional ratings
Review scores
Source	Rating
AllMusic	4.5/5 stars
Entertainment Weekly	A−
The Guardian	4/5 stars
Los Angeles Times	3.5/4 stars
NME	8/10
Pitchfork	0.8/10 (1998); 8.5/10 (2018)
Rolling Stone	4/5 stars
Spin	8/10
Uncut	5/5 stars
The Village Voice	A−

In a rave review for Uncut, Robert McTaggart declared that The Boy with the Arab Strap "marks Belle and Sebastian's arrival as a fully-fleshed group", finding that they "reveal a refreshing diversity" with the album's "increasingly rich and breathtaking arrangements". Ben Ratliff of Rolling Stone welcomed "the greater richness and sophistication" of the music and said that while the band's previous records were "assiduously cloistered and rickety, best heard at private moments on headphones, this album's got brilliant Spector-sound sunsets." Writing for Spin, Douglas Wolk believed that Belle and Sebastian's sense of "modesty" worked to the album's advantage: "Listen closely ... and you'll relish the tiny filigreed details, the unexpected instrumental accents they can pull off only by having half the group sit out half a song, Murdoch's wry turns of phrase and flip-flops between intertextual cleverness and heart-on-sleeve honesty."

John Mulvey commented in NME that Belle and Sebastian "leaves almost all their contemporaries for dead" with a record that "locates an emotional chord largely neglected by the British mainstream since the demise of the Smiths, but is presented with an air of aloofness and/or shyness more suitable to a tiny side project of the Pastels." Noting the album's "echoes of Ray Davies and Morrissey", Los Angeles Times critic Steve Hochman described Murdoch's lyrics as being steeped in "suspicions, fears, doubts and pointed barbs", yet also a "sympathy for his lyrical targets" that "tempers any nastiness." The Village Voice's Robert Christgau observed that as a songwriter, Murdoch "pins his themes down one scenario at a time" in structured songs rather than "music that wanders hill and dale", achieving a sound that "comes out beautiful and fragile."

Retrospectively, AllMusic critic Stephen Thomas Erlewine wrote that The Boy with the Arab Strap, rather than exploring "new ground", "essentially consolidates the group's talents" and "offers another round of timeless, endlessly fascinating folk-pop treasures", showcasing Murdoch's "vicious wit" and "effortless gift for elegant melancholia". Having panned it in 1998 as sounding like Belle and Sebastian "decided to parody themselves", Pitchfork reappraised the album in 2018 as a "wholly beautiful and delicate" work featuring "some of their darkest and most detailed songs", with staff writer Scott Plagenhoef opining that the album's "precious" sound presaged the band's later move towards "more overt flourishes" and "happy-clappy, feel-good pop".

In October 2011, NME placed the title track at number 130 on its list "150 Best Tracks of the Past 15 Years". The album sold 200,000 units through 2006.

== Track listing ==
The Boy with the Arab Strap track listing
No.	Title	Length
1.	"It Could Have Been a Brilliant Career"	2:24
2.	"Sleep the Clock Around"	4:58
3.	"Is It Wicked Not to Care?"	3:22
4.	"Ease Your Feet in the Sea"	3:35
5.	"A Summer Wasting"	2:06
6.	"Seymour Stein"	4:42
7.	"A Space Boy Dream"	3:00
8.	"Dirty Dream Number Two"	4:14
9.	"The Boy with the Arab Strap"	5:14
10.	"Chickfactor"	3:30
11.	"Simple Things"	1:46
12.	"The Rollercoaster Ride"	6:36
Total length:		45:27

== Personnel ==
=== Belle and Sebastian ===
- Stuart Murdoch – lead vocals (all except where noted), guitar, keyboard
- Stuart David – bass, spoken word ("A Space Boy Dream")
- Isobel Campbell – cello, lead vocals ("Is it Wicked Not to Care?"), co-lead vocals ("Sleep the Clock Around", "The Rollercoaster Ride"), spoken word ("Dirty Dream Number Two"), guitar, percussion, recorder
- Chris Geddes – keyboards, piano
- Richard Colburn – drums
- Stevie Jackson – guitar, lead vocals ("Seymour Stein", "Chickfactor")
- Sarah Martin – violin, keyboard, percussion
- Mick Cooke – trumpet

=== Additional musicians ===
- Ian MacKay – bagpipes on "Sleep the Clock Around"
- Neil Robertson – bass on "A Space Boy Dream"
- Gail Anderson, Claire Campbell, Eilidh Campbell, Euan Forrester, David D MacKay and Sarah Wilson – the string section on "A Space Boy Dream" and "Dirty Dream Number Two"

== Charts ==
Chart performance for The Boy with the Arab Strap
Chart (1998)	Peak position
French Albums (SNEP)	39
Norwegian Albums (VG-lista)	7
Swedish Albums (Sverigetopplistan)	30
UK Albums (Official Charts)	12
