= Belle and Sebastian =

Scottish indie pop band

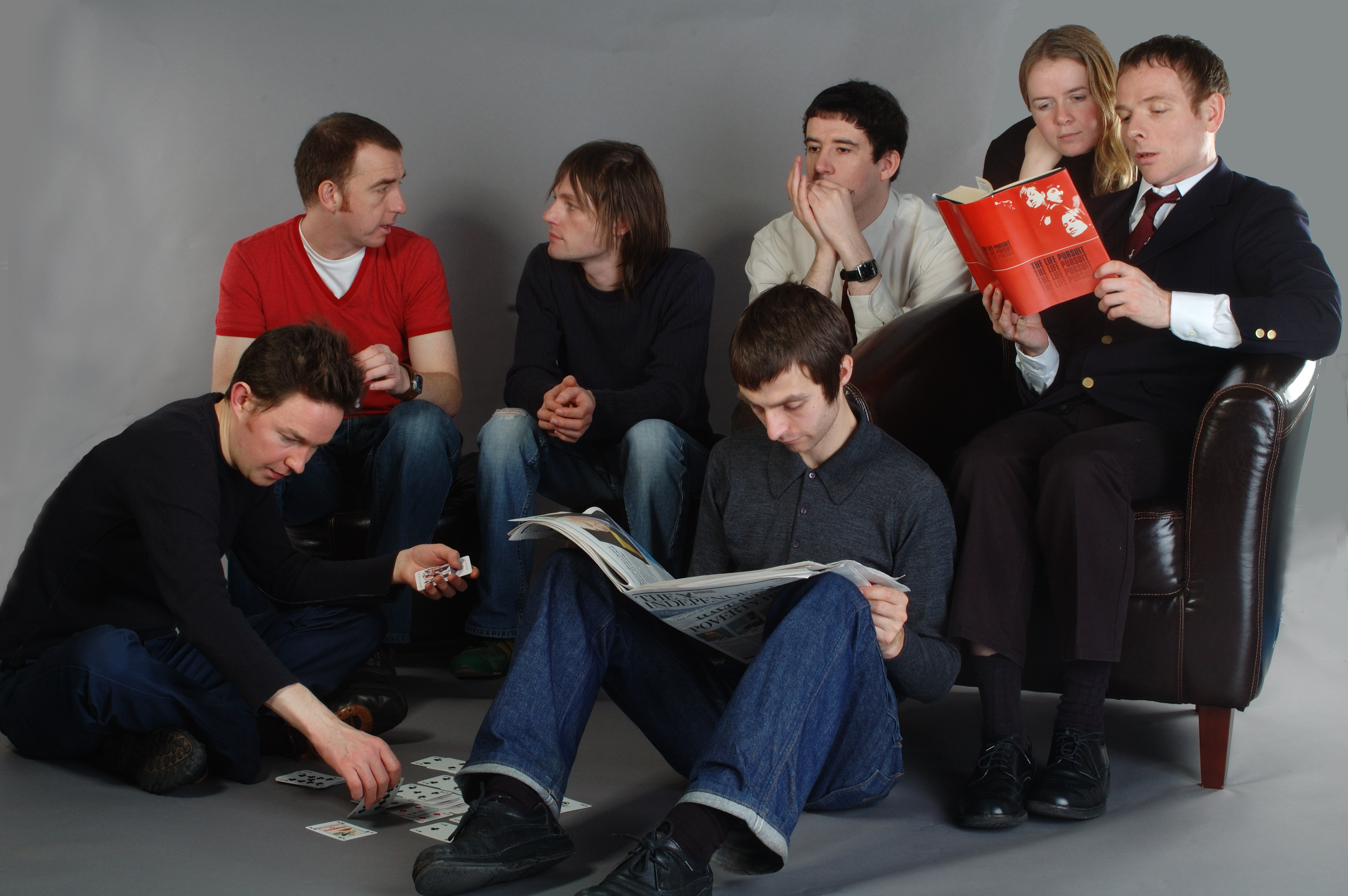
- Members of Belle and Sebastian, pictured sometime between 2005 and 2006. Left to right: Mick Cooke, Richard Colburn, Bobby Kildea, Chris Geddes, Stevie Jackson, Sarah Martin, Stuart Murdoch

Background information
- Origin: Glasgow, Scotland
- Genres: Indie pop; twee pop; indie rock; chamber pop
- Years active: 1996–present
- Labels: Rough Trade; Jeepster; Matador; Arts & Crafts México
- Members: Stuart Murdoch; Stevie Jackson; Sarah Martin; Chris Geddes; Richard Colburn; Bobby Kildea; Dave McGowan
- Past members: Mick Cooke; Isobel Campbell; Stuart David
- Website: belleandsebastian.com

Belle and Sebastian are a Scottish indie pop band formed in Glasgow in 1996. Led by Stuart Murdoch, Belle and Sebastian have released twelve studio albums. The band are often compared with acts such as the Smiths and Nick Drake. Belle and Sebastian took their name from a short story Murdoch had written about a boy and girl, whose title was a play on the 1965 television series Belle and Sebastian.

== History ==
=== Formation, early years and Tigermilk (1994–1996) ===
In 1994, Stuart Murdoch and Stuart David both enrolled at Stow College's Beatbox programme for unemployed musicians in Glasgow. The pair recorded some demos, which in 1996 were picked up by the college's Music Business course, led by music professor Alan Rankine (formerly of the Associates), that produces and releases one single each year on the college's label, Electric Honey. As Murdoch had a number of songs already and the label was extremely impressed with the demos, he was granted permission to record a full-length album, which was recorded mostly live over three days, entitled Tigermilk.

Murdoch and David recruited local musicians Stevie Jackson (guitar and vocals), Isobel Campbell (cello/vocals), Chris Geddes (keys) and Richard Colburn (drums), the latter of whom shared a flat with David and was a student on the Music Business course, to perform on the album, with Murdoch describing the process as a "product of botched capitalism". The band chose the name Belle and Sebastian from a short story Murdoch had written inspired by the television series of the same name, about a six-year-old boy and his dog, named Belle, a Pyrenean Mountain Dog. In June 1996, Electric Honey pressed up one thousand copies of Tigermilk on vinyl.

=== If You're Feeling Sinister and early EPs (1996–1998) ===
The warm response Tigermilk received led to the band being signed to Jeepster Records in August 1996, who released their second album If You're Feeling Sinister on 18 November. The album was named by Spin as one of the 100 greatest albums between 1985 and 2005, and it is widely considered the band's masterpiece. Just before the recording of Sinister, Sarah Martin (violin/vocals) joined the band.

Following this a series of EPs were released throughout 1997. The first of these was Dog on Wheels, released in May and consisting of four demo tracks recorded prior to the real formation of the band. In fact, the only long-term band members to play on the songs were Murdoch, David, and Mick Cooke, who played trumpet on the EP but would not officially join the band until a few years later. It charted at No. 59 in the UK singles chart. The Lazy Line Painter Jane EP followed in July. The track was recorded in the church where Murdoch lived and features vocals from Monica Queen. The EP narrowly missed out on the UK top 40, peaking at No. 41. The last of the EPs was October's 3.. 6.. 9 Seconds of Light. The EP was made Single of the Week in both the NME and Melody Maker and reached No. 32 in the charts, thus becoming the band's first top 40 single.

Despite the band's growing popularity, during this period they kept a low profile at the insistence of Murdoch, who was still regaining his strength following years struggling with myalgic encephalomyelitis/chronic fatigue syndrome (ME/CFS). The band played gigs sporadically, rarely gave interviews, and refused to appear in publicity photographs, often getting friends and acquaintances to pose instead. The relative reclusiveness helped to create an aura of mystique around them.

=== The Boy with the Arab Strap, Fold Your Hands Child, You Walk Like a Peasant and Line-up Changes (1998–2003) ===
'The Boy with the Arab Strap'
The title of the album, The Boy with the Arab Strap caused some tension between Belle and Sebastian and fellow Scots band Arab Strap.

The band released their third LP, The Boy with the Arab Strap in 1998, and it reached No. 12 in the UK charts. Arab Strap garnered an NPR interview and positive reviews from Rolling Stone and The Village Voice, and others; however, the album has its detractors, including Pitchfork, who gave the album a particularly poor review, calling it a "parody" of their earlier work (Pitchfork has since removed the review from their website and re-reviewed the album positively in 2018). During the recording of the album, long-time studio trumpet-player Mick Cooke was asked to join the band as a full member. The This Is Just a Modern Rock Song EP followed later that year.

In 1999, the band was awarded with Best Newcomer (for their third album) at the BRIT Awards, upsetting better-known acts such as Steps and 5ive. That same year, the band hosted their own festival, the Bowlie Weekender. Tigermilk was also given a full release by Jeepster before the band started work on their next LP. The result was Fold Your Hands Child, You Walk Like a Peasant, which became the band's first top 10 album in the UK, though critics felt that the band were starting to stagnate. A stand-alone single, "Legal Man", reached No. 15 and gave them their first appearance on Top of the Pops.

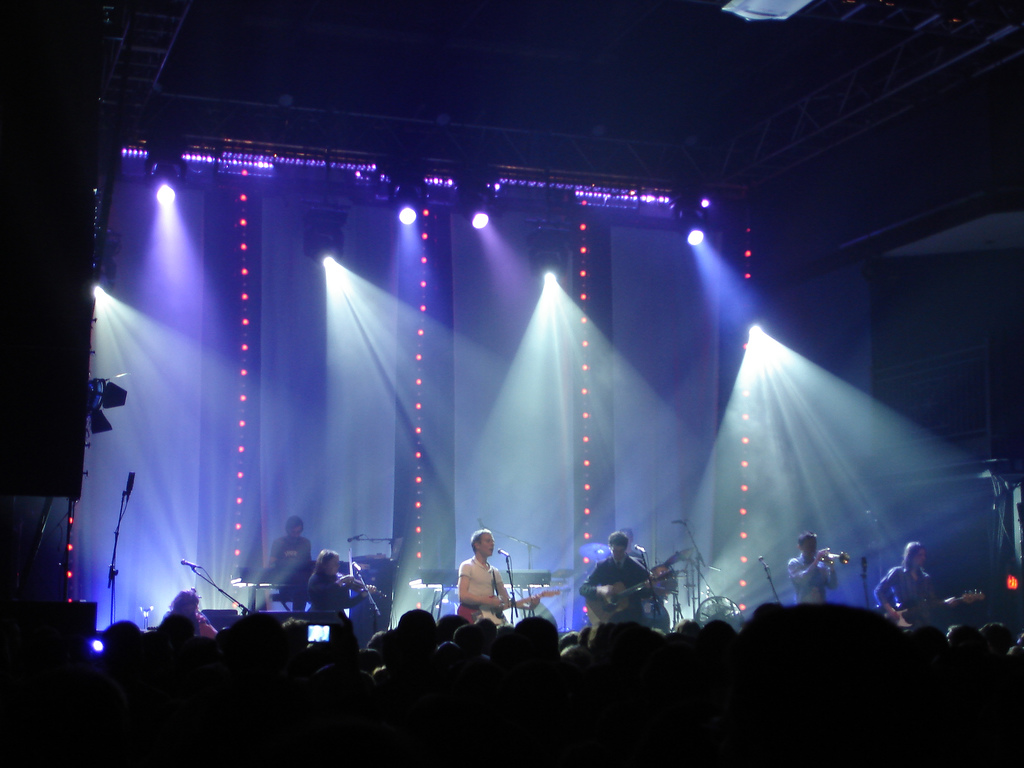
Belle and Sebastian performing at the 9:30 Club in Washington, D.C., in 2006

As the band's popularity and recognition was growing worldwide, their music began appearing in films and on television. The 2000 film High Fidelity mentions the band (with Jack Black's character referring to them as "old sad bastard music" and disdaining their soft style) and features a clip from the song "Seymour Stein" from The Boy with the Arab Strap. Two songs by the band ("Expectations" and "Piazza, New York Catcher") appeared on the soundtrack for the 2007 hit film Juno. Also, the title track from Arab Strap was played over the end credits of the UK television series Teachers, and the lyric "Colour my life with the chaos of trouble" from the song was quoted by one of the characters in the 2009 film (500) Days of Summer.

Stuart David soon left the band to concentrate on his side project, Looper, and his book writing, which included his The Idle Thoughts of a Daydreamer. He was replaced by Bobby Kildea of V-Twin. The "Jonathan David" single, sung by Stevie Jackson, was released in June 2001 and was followed by "I'm Waking Up to Us" in November, which saw the band use an outside producer (Mike Hurst) for the first time. Most of 2002 was spent touring and recording a soundtrack album, Storytelling (for Storytelling by Todd Solondz). Campbell left the band in the spring of 2002, in the middle of the band's North American tour to pursue a solo career, first as The Gentle Waves, and later under her own name. She later collaborated with singer Mark Lanegan on three albums.

=== Dear Catastrophe Waitress, The Life Pursuit and hiatus (2003–2010) ===
The band left Jeepster in 2002, signing a four-album deal with Rough Trade Records. Their first album for Rough Trade, Dear Catastrophe Waitress, was released in 2003 and was produced by Trevor Horn. The album showed a markedly more "produced" sound compared to their first four LPs, as the band was making a concerted effort to produce more "radio-friendly" music. At this point, the band began to engage more with the press and started appearing in publicity shots. The album was warmly received and is credited with restoring the band's "indie cred". The album also marked the return of Murdoch as the group's primary songwriter, following the poorly received Fold Your Hands Child, You Walk Like a Peasant and Storytelling, both of which were more collaborative than the band's early work. A documentary DVD, Fans Only, was released by Jeepster in October 2003, featuring promotional videos, live clips and unreleased footage. A single from the album, "Step into My Office, Baby" followed in November 2003; it would be their first single to be taken from an album, and included a track recorded with Divine Comedy producer Darren Allison entitled Love on the March.

The Thin Lizzy-inspired "I'm a Cuckoo" was the second single from the album. It achieved their highest chart position yet, reaching No. 14 in the UK. The Books EP followed, a double A-side single led by "Wrapped Up in Books" from Dear Catastrophe Waitress and the new "Your Cover's Blown". This EP became the band's third top 20 UK release, and the band was nominated for both the Mercury Music Prize and an Ivor Novello Award. In January 2005, B&S was voted Scotland's greatest band in a poll by The List, beating Simple Minds, Idlewild, Travis, Franz Ferdinand, and the Proclaimers, among others.

In April 2005, members of the band visited Israel and the Palestinian territories with the UK charity War on Want; the group subsequently recorded a song inspired by the trip titled "The Eighth Station of the Cross Kebab House", which would first appear on the digital-download version of the charity album Help!: A Day in the Life and would later have a physical release as a B-side on 2006's "Funny Little Frog" single. Push Barman to Open Old Wounds, a compilation of the Jeepster singles and EPs, was released in May 2005 while the band were recording their seventh album in California. The result of the sessions was The Life Pursuit, produced by Tony Hoffer. The album, originally intended to be a double album, became the band's highest-charting album upon its release in February 2006, peaking at No. 8 in the UK and No. 65 on the US Billboard 200. "Funny Little Frog", which preceded it, also proved to be their highest-charting single, debuting at No. 13.

On 6 July 2006, the band played a historic show with the Los Angeles Philharmonic at the Hollywood Bowl. The opening act at the 18,000 seat sell-out concert was the Shins. The members of the band see this as a landmark event, with Stevie Jackson saying, "This is the biggest thrill of my entire life". In October 2006, members of the band helped put together a CD collection of new songs for children titled Colours Are Brighter, with the involvement of major bands such as Franz Ferdinand and the Flaming Lips.

On 18 November 2008 the band released The BBC Sessions, which features songs from the period of 1996–2001 (including the last recordings featuring Isobel Campbell before she left the band), along with a second disc featuring a recording of a live performance in Belfast from Christmas 2001.

=== Write About Love and Girls In Peacetime Want to Dance (2010–2016) ===
On 17 July 2010, the band performed their first UK gig in almost four years to a crowd of around 30,000 at Latitude Festival in Henham Park, Southwold. They performed two new songs, "I Didn't See It Coming" and "I'm Not Living in the Real World".

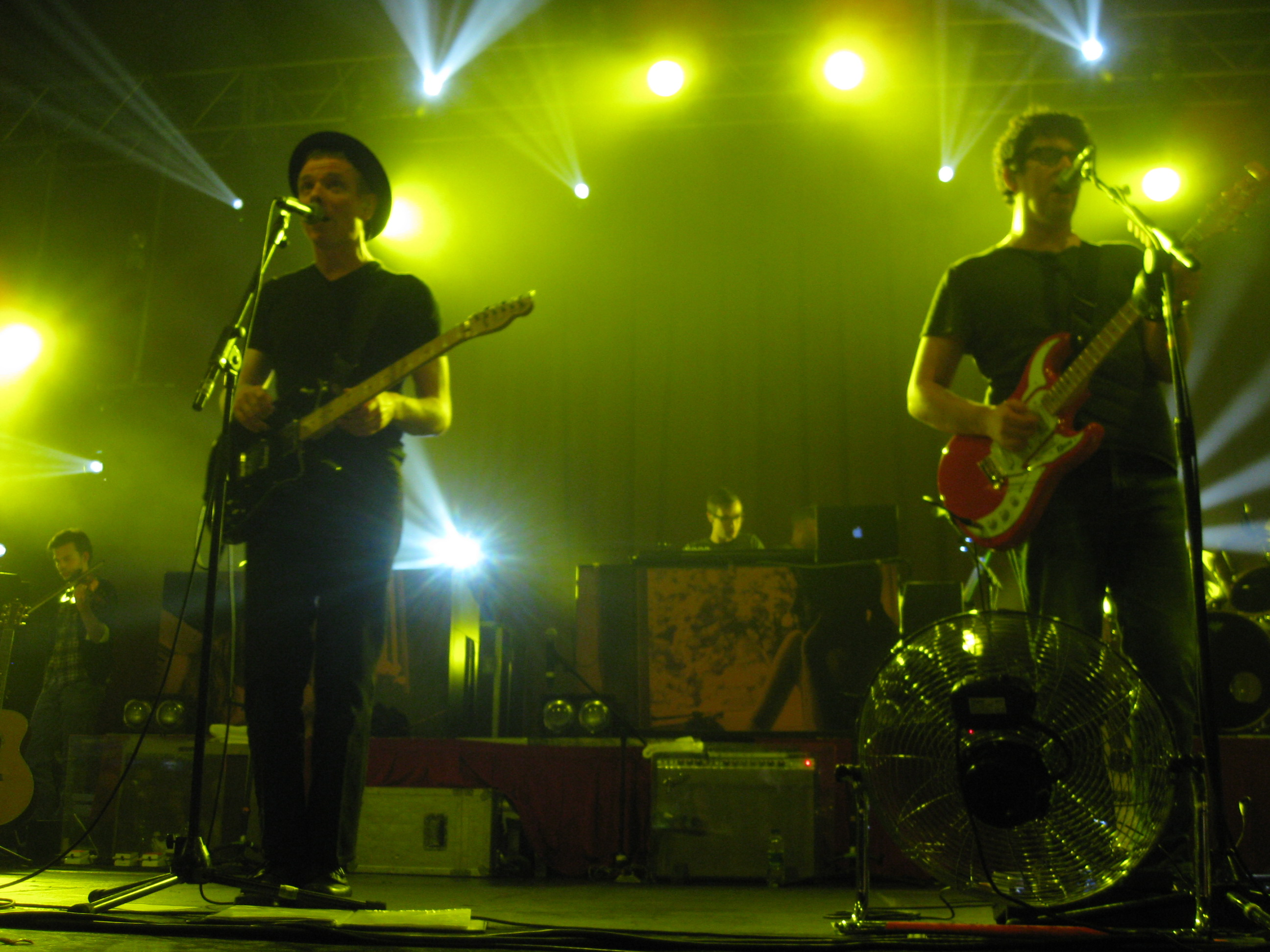
Onstage in Berlin, 2011

Their eighth studio album, released in the UK and internationally on 25 September 2010, was titled Write about Love. The first single from the album, as well as the record's title track "Write about Love", was released in the US on 7 September 2010. Write about Love entered the UK albums chart in its first week of release, peaking at No. 8 as of 19 October 2010. Norah Jones is featured on the track "Little Lou, Ugly Jack, Prophet John", and Carey Mulligan sings on the title track.

In December 2010 Belle and Sebastian curated the sequel to the Bowlie Weekender in the form of Bowlie 2 presented by All Tomorrow's Parties.

In 2013, Pitchfork TV released an hour-long documentary in February, directed by RJ Bentler which focused on the band's 1996 album If You're Feeling Sinister, as well as the formation and early releases of the band. The documentary featured interviews with every member that was present on the album, as well as several archival photos and videos from the band's early days. The band compiled a second compilation album The Third Eye Centre which included the B-sides and rarities released after Push Barman to Open Old Wounds, from the albums Dear Catastrophe Waitress, The Life Pursuit, and Write about Love. In an interview at the end of 2013, Mick Cooke confirmed he had left the band on good terms.

The band received an 'Outstanding Contribution to Music Award' at the NME Awards 2014.

In 2014, the band returned to the studio, recording in Atlanta, Georgia for their ninth studio album, along with announcing tour dates for various festivals and concerts across the world during 2014. Their ninth album Girls in Peacetime Want to Dance was released on 19 January 2015. It was their first album with Dave McGowan, who had been their touring bassist since 2011.

The Belle and Sebastian song "There's Too Much Love" forms much of the soundtrack for the Brazilian film The Way He Looks, about a blind, gay teenage boy and his friends, released in 2014.

Belle and Sebastian performed at the Glastonbury Festival on 28 June 2015, on 'The Other Stage' and at O2 Academy, Glasgow in March 2017 which was televised in the UK as part of the 'BBC 6 MUSIC Presents Festival'.

=== How to Solve Our Human Problems, A Bit of Previous and Late Developers (2017–present) ===
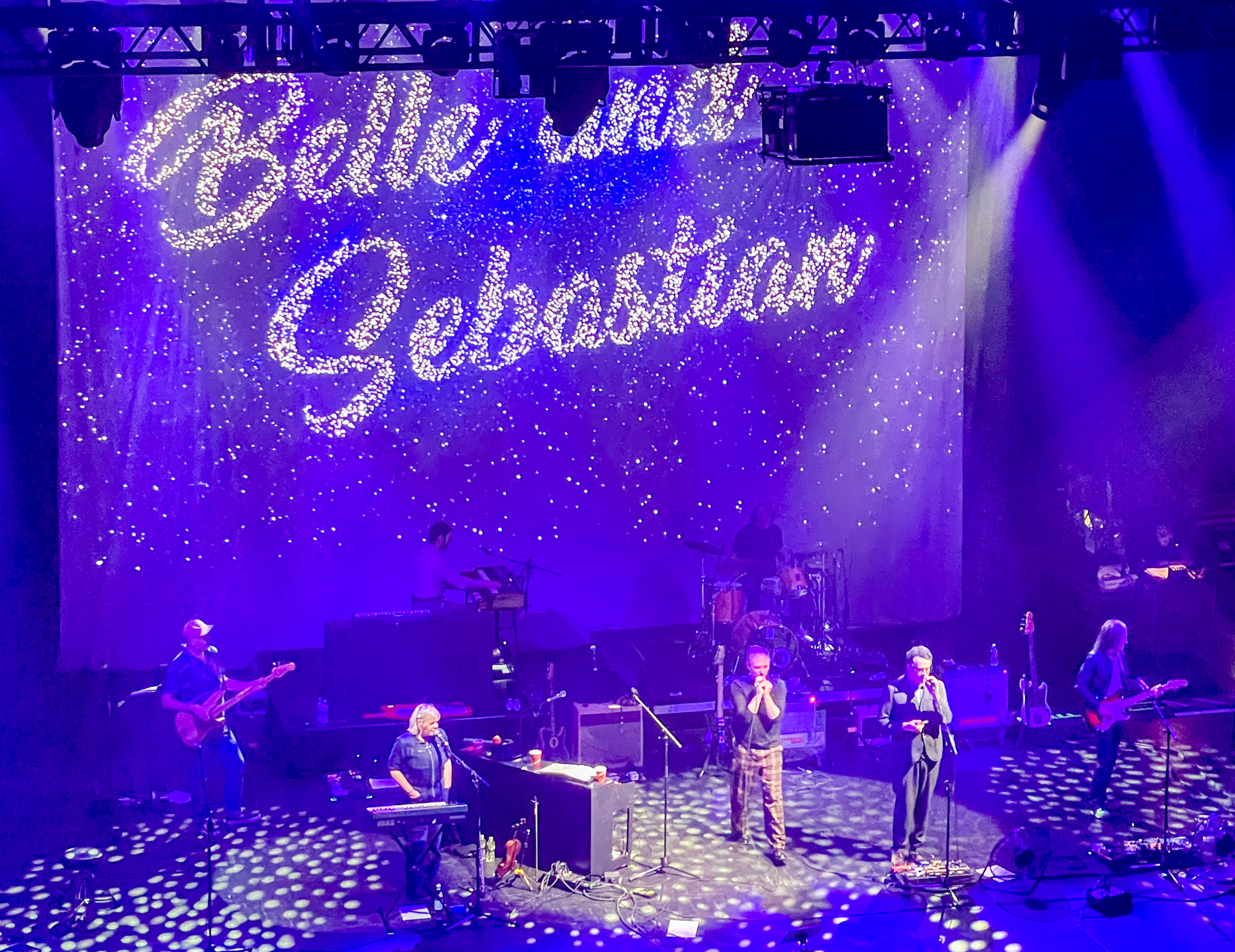
Performing "Piazza, New York Catcher" at the Orpheum Boston, 2024

In mid-2017, the band put out a new single, "We Were Beautiful". During the same year, the band appeared in the news for a comical story that occurred during their US tour, in which they accidentally forgot Colburn in a North Dakota Walmart. In December 2017 and January and February 2018, the band released a trio of EPs under the name How to Solve Our Human Problems.

On 3 November 2018, the band announced that Dave McGowan had become a member.

In August 2019, to celebrate the 20th anniversary of the first Bowlie Weekender festival, Belle & Sebastian held a third festival, dubbed the Boaty Weekender. Unlike the previous two festivals, the Boaty Weekender was held on a cruise ship in the Mediterranean Sea instead of UK holiday parks.

The band's eleventh studio album, A Bit of Previous, was released in May 2022.

In January 2023, the band announced the surprise release of their twelfth studio album, Late Developers. Lead single "I Don't Know What You See in Me" was released on 9 January 2023 with the album released on 13 January 2023.

== Collaborations and side projects ==
- The Reindeer Section were a Scottish indie rock supergroup formed in 2001 by Gary Lightbody of Snow Patrol, which released albums and gigged in 2001 and 2002. It featured Richard Colburn, Mick Cooke and Bobby Kildea from Belle and Sebastian.
- The Vaselines are an alternative rock band formed in Glasgow in 1986. Between 2008 and 2014 their lineup featured Stevie Jackson and Bobby Kildea from Belle and Sebastian and they performed at Bowlie Weekender 2 curated by Belle and Sebastian in December 2010.
- Tired Pony was a country / Americana supergroup formed by Gary Lightbody of Snow Patrol in 2010. It features Richard Colburn from Belle and Sebastian.
- God Help the Girl is a musical project by Stuart Murdoch, featuring a group of female vocalists, including Catherine Ireton, with Belle and Sebastian as the accompanying band.
- Looper is an electronic music group fronted by Stuart David.
- The Gentle Waves was a side project of Isobel Campbell before she left the band in 2002. The project's first album, The Green Fields of Foreverland, featured "players from Belle and Sebastian" as per the gatefold sticker and the personnel notes.

== Band members ==
Current members

- Stuart Murdoch – lead vocals, guitar, keyboards (1994–present)
- Stevie Jackson – guitar, backing and occasional lead vocals, piano (1996–present)
- Chris Geddes – keyboards, piano, percussion (1996–present)
- Richard Colburn – drums, percussion (1996–present)
- Sarah Martin – backing and occasional lead vocals, violin, guitar, flute, keyboards, recorder, percussion (1996–present)
- Bobby Kildea – guitar, bass (2001–present)
- Dave McGowan – bass, keyboards, guitar (2018–present; touring musician 2012–2018)

Former members

- Stuart David – bass (1994–2000)
- Isobel Campbell – backing and occasional lead vocals, cello, guitar (1996–2002)
- Mick Cooke – trumpet, guitar, bass, percussion (1998–2013; touring musician 1996–1998)

Timeline

== Discography ==
Studio albums

- Tigermilk (1996)
- If You're Feeling Sinister (1996)
- The Boy with the Arab Strap (1998)
- Fold Your Hands Child, You Walk Like a Peasant (2000)
- Storytelling (2002)
- Dear Catastrophe Waitress (2003)
- The Life Pursuit (2006)
- Write About Love (2010)
- Girls in Peacetime Want to Dance (2015)
- Days of the Bagnold Summer (2019)
- A Bit of Previous (2022)
- Late Developers (2023)

== See also ==
- List of bands from Glasgow
