= His Latest Flame (band) =

Scottish band

- Origin: Glasgow, Scotland
- Genres: Pop; new wave
- Years active: 1983–1990
- Labels: Go; London; Last Night From Glasgow
- Members: Trish Reid; Jacquie Bradley; Laura Mazzolini; Irene Brown; Moira Rankin

His Latest Flame are a Scottish girl group, initially forming in 1983 and disbanding in 1990. The all-girl act were originally formed from members of Sophisticated Boom Boom following the departure of their vocalist Libby McArthur in 1983.

With their new vocalist Moira Rankin, His Latest Flame signed to a major label, London Records, and recorded one studio album, In the Neighbourhood, in 1989 before disbanding in 1990. Their sound is described as "Scotland's answer to the Bangles".

== History ==
The band started from five friends from Glasgow deciding to make music together. Sophisticated Boom Boom became a mainstay in the early 1980s Glasgow music scene until singer Libby McArthur became pregnant in 1983. The band decided to go on without her after changing their name to His Latest Flame and recruited a new vocalist, Moira Rankin.

In 1986, they released the track "Somebody's Gonna Get Hurt" on Go! Discs. This same year they supported the Housemartins on tour.

Later they signed with London Records and released their debut album, In the Neighbourhood, in 1989.

They performed on BBC One's primetime chat show Wogan on 18 October 1989 and supported Edwyn Collins when he played the Pavilion Theatre, Glasgow.

The band decided to call it a day in 1990.

== Members ==
Members

- Trish Reid – guitar (1983–1990)
- Jacquie Bradley – drums (1983–1990)
- Laura Mazzolini – bass (1983–1990)
- Irene Brown – guitar (1983–1990)
- Moira Rankin – vocals (1983–1990)

== Discography ==
=== Studio albums ===
- His Latest Flame – In the Neighbourhood Vinyl LP (1989, London Records)

Track listing for In the Neighbourhood (1989)
No.	Title	Length
1.	"Londonderry Road"
2.	"Heart Of The Country"
3.	"Finest Hour"
4.	"Big World"
5.	"Cold, Cold, Cold"
6.	"Love's In The Neighbourhood"
7.	"America Blue"
8.	"Crack Me Down"
9.	"Sporting Life"
10.	"Take It In Your Stride"
11.	"Old Flame"

== Later life and legacy ==
- In later years, Jacquie Bradley became a deputy headteacher before retiring to the Isle of Bute. In February 2023, Bradley took part in a panel discussion at Glasgow's Centre for Contemporary Arts with other panellists including Robert Hodgens (aka Bobby Bluebell of the Bluebells), Alison Gourlay (of the Jazzateers). The event was to mark a celebration of the book, Hungry Beat: The Scottish Pop Underground Movement and also featured a performance by a Hungry beat supergroup including: Ken McCluskey of the Bluebells, Malcolm Ross of Orange Juice, Douglas MacIntyre of Article 58 and Love and Money, and Campbell Owens of Aztec Camera, as well as guest vocalists Norman Blake of Teenage Fanclub, Fay Fife of the Rezillos, Grahame Skinner of Hipsway, and Katy Lironi of the Secret Goldfish.
- Tricia Reid became head of the school of arts and communication design at Reading University.
- Irene Brown works in the care and social work sector.
- Laura Mazzolini is a company director. (Mazzolini's other half, Craig Armstrong, also happens to have found a certain fame and success).
- Moira Rankin joined dance music group QFX after His Latest Flame disbanded.

=== Since Yesterday (documentary) ===
His Latest Flame were featured in the 2024 documentary film, Since Yesterday, which traces the evolution of trailblazing Scottish girl groups and female-led bands and includes personal anecdotes from the band members.

"My first gig was at the Barrowland and it's only now making this film that I found the very first band onstage after it reopened was a girl band from Glasgow called His Latest Flame... For me, knowing about that as a teenager would have normalised that bands can be all women and still play places like there." - director, Carla J. Easton.

The point of the documentary for me, is that it restores to the historical record a sense that some sort of genealogy of girl bands in Scotland actually did exist. These women existed and, pardon my language, were f***ing gallus for even doing it at all... There were lots of reasons not to do it, and the industry itself just focused on what guys did. Apart from maybe Jill and Rose [Bryson and McDowall], because Strawberry Switchblade got in the charts.

We were amazingly, weirdly confident. We were around at the right time and just thought, well, everyone else is doing it, so we can too.

Tricia Reid, His Latest Flame guitarist speaking at the documentary's gala screening.
