= Sophisticated Boom Boom (band) =

Scottish band

- Origin: Glasgow, Scotland
- Genres: Pop-punk, new wave
- Years active: 1981–1983
- Label: Last Night From Glasgow
- Members: Trish Reid; Jacquie Bradley; Laura Mazzolini; Irene Brown
- Past members: Libby McArthur

Sophisticated Boom Boom are a Scottish girl group, initially forming in 1981 and disbanding in 1983. The five-piece all-girl act were formed from a group of pals and became a trailblazing mainstay in the early 1980s Glasgow music scene.

Their "tough girl pop sound" was reminiscent of the Undertones, the Bluebells and the Mo-dettes. They took their name from a song by the Shangri-Las titled "Sophisticated Boom Boom", released on their album Shangri-Las-65!

== History ==
=== Beginnings ===
The band started from five friends from Glasgow deciding to make music together. Libby McArthur and Jacquie Bradley were school pals. McArthur found herself working in a community centre in the Gorbals performing puppet shows after her application to attend drama school had come to nothing. It was at the community centre that McArthur also met Tricia Reid who was in the exact same position, but could play the guitar. McArthur said to Reid, "I've a pal in Castlemilk who also who wants to be in a band, come and we'll be in a band together?"

Guitarist Irene Brown and bassist Laura Mazzolini would go on to join the band a little later.

"Jackie and I started making music in her bedroom on a Farfisa organ that her mum and dad acted as guarantors on from McCormack's (the influential, lamented music shop in Glasgow). Then me and Jackie and Tricia started the band. We were working in a community centre on a YTS at £23.50 a week. I thought it was a great name and it suited us really well. I was wearing frocks with tackety boots, and that was a kind of sophisticated boom boom juxtaposition."

— Libby McArthur, vocalist.

=== The Hellfire Club ===
The five-piece took their name, Sophisticated Boom Boom, from a B-side by American pop girl group the Shangri-Las.

Their early punk/rock influences were Siouxsie and the Banshees and Dolly Mixture. The band performed regularly at, and lived above, the Hellfire Club, a rehearsal space and recording basement studio that Jacquie Bradley ran with David Henderson in the St George's Cross area of central Glasgow.

"Studio is a loose term. It was a sh**hole." – Jacquie Bradley.

Many bands that got a record deal did their demos in this tiny studio with Jacquie Bradley and David Henderson. The girls would also sneak downstairs to use other bands' kit, namely Aztec Camera and Altered Images.

"We'd be rushing in as all these bands were coming out – Simple Minds, Aztec Camera, The Bluebells, Shakin' Pyramids – and The Dreamboys, of course – Peter Capaldi, Craig Ferguson, Temple Clark... anybody who was anybody."

=== Early success ===
The English radio DJ John Peel went on to champion the band and they recorded three John Peel sessions at Maida Vale Studios in London. After building a loyal following in Scotland they made the cover of the music paper NME. The band also appeared on the Channel Four music show The Tube and supported gigs with Echo & the Bunnymen.

Sophisticated Boom Boom were due to support Simple Minds at the Glasgow Barrowlands music venue in 1983 when vocalist Libby McArthur discovered she was pregnant. This led to a "bedroom meeting" to discuss what would happen with the band and McArthur was told the band would go on without her.

McArthur recalled that:

"I remember clearly saying, 'power to your elbow girls, go for it. But you, you and you - don't ever talk to me again. I told them I didn't want anything but insisted they weren't to have the band's name. That was my fit of pique. I was 22, and all the things anyone is at 22....We really felt that the Simple Minds gig at the Barras was going to be the last tuppence in the Penny Falls for us."

=== His Latest Flame ===
This change in lineup (with new vocalist Moira Rankin) led to a rift and the group changing their name to His Latest Flame. Drummer Jacquie Bradley would also later leave the band when she too became pregnant.

His Latest Flame released several singles in the late 1980s before deciding to call it a day.

=== Reforming the band ===
Sophisticated Boom Boom reformed to play at Leith Theatre, Edinburgh, as part of a tribute night (named after Strawberry Switchblade's hit "Since Yesterday") to the women pioneers of Scottish pop during the 2018 International Edinburgh Festival.

The band also reunited to perform at a special one-off gig at the Glasgow music venue Mono following the release of the 2024 music documentary Since Yesterday: The Untold Story of Scotland's Girl Bands. Other artists appearing at the night included Jeanette Gallagher (the McKinleys), Louise Rutkowski (Sunset Gun/This Mortal Coil) and Hen Hoose.

== Members ==
Members

- Trish Reid – guitar (1981–1983, 2018, 2024)
- Jacquie Bradley – drums (1981–1983, 2018, 2024)
- Laura Mazzolini – bass (1981–1983, 2018, 2024)
- Irene Brown – guitar (1981–1983, 2018, 2024)
- Libby McArthur – vocals (1981–1983, 2018, 2024)

== Discography ==
=== Compilation albums ===
- Sophisticated Boom Boom – The Complete Sessions Vinyl LP (2024, Last Night From Glasgow)

Twelve tracks from three separate BBC Peel Sessions in 1981, 1982 and 1983.

Track listing for Sophisticated Boom Boom – the Complete Peel sessions
No.	Title	Length
1.	"White Horses"
2.	"Is It About Sex?"
3.	"Surrender To Me"
4.	"Joe"
5.	"Don't Love Me"
6.	"Hearts On Skates"
7.	"Stalemates"
8.	"Instant"
9.	"Singing Today"
10.	"Jimmy's In Love"
11.	"Next Time"
12.	"Courage"

== Later life and legacy ==
- In later years, Jacquie Bradley became a depute headteacher before retiring to the Isle of Bute. In February 2023, Bradley took part in a panel discussion at Glasgow's Centre for Contemporary Arts with other panellists including Robert Hodgens (aka Bobby Bluebell of the Bluebells), Alison Gourlay (of the Jazzateers). The event was to mark a celebration of the book Hungry Beat: The Scottish Pop Underground Movement and also featured a performance by a Hungry beat supergroup including: Ken McCluskey of the Bluebells, Malcolm Ross of Orange Juice, Douglas MacIntyre of Article 58 and Love and Money, and Campbell Owens of Aztec Camera, as well as guest vocalists Norman Blake of Teenage Fanclub, Fay Fife of the Rezillos, Grahame Skinner of Hipsway, and Katy Lironi of the Secret Goldfish.
- Libby McArthur is an actor appearing in the soap opera River City and a humanist celebrant.
- Tricia Reid became head of the school of arts and communication design at Reading University.
- Irene Brown works in the care and social work sector.
- Laura Mazzolini is a company director. (Mazzolini's other half, Craig Armstrong, also happens to have found a certain fame and success).

All five original band members of Sophisticated Boom Boom kept in close touch through the years.

"We never really came apart... It was like having sisters. When I left the band I had such a hard time not being around them any more. We were very lucky to have had that." – Laura Mazzolini, bassist.

Sophisticated Boom Boom were featured in the 2024 documentary film Since Yesterday, which traces the evolution of trailblazing Scottish girl groups and female-led bands and includes personal anecdotes from the five band members.

The point of the documentary for me, is that it restores to the historical record a sense that some sort of genealogy of girl bands in Scotland actually did exist. These women existed and, pardon my language, were f***ing gallus for even doing it at all... There were lots of reasons not to do it, and the industry itself just focused on what guys did. Apart from maybe Jill and Rose [Bryson and McDowall], because Strawberry Switchblade got in the charts.

We were amazingly, weirdly confident. We were around at the right time and just thought, well, everyone else is doing it, so we can too.

—
Tricia Reid, Sophisticated Boom Boom guitarist, speaking at the documentary's gala screening.
