= Frank Maguire =

Frank Maguire may refer to:

- Frank Maguire (politician) (1929–1981), Irish politician, Independent MP for Fermanagh & South Tyrone
- Frank Maguire (solicitor) (1955–2011), Scottish solicitor and campaigner for victims of injustice
