= Amy Duncan =

Amy Duncan may refer to:

- Amy Duncan (singer), Scottish singer-songwriter
- Amy Duncan (Good Luck Charlie), television character
