= Twinsets =

Scottish band

The Twinsets
- Origin: Edinburgh, Scotland
- Genres: Indie, Motown, Poppunk
- Years active: fl. 1980-1985
- Members: Gaye Bell - vocals; Rachel Bell - vocals; Dru Farmer - drums; Nick Haines - guitar / piano; Rory Hall - guitar; David Mack - drums; Stuart Wright - drums; Norman Bell - bass, drum

The Twinsets were an early 80's Scottish indie band from Edinburgh fronted by two peroxide-blonde sisters, Gaye and Rachel Bell.

The band's Motown-inspired pop-punk sound became a successful mainstay on the early 1980's university circuit and they recorded three Peel sessions before disbanding sometime in the mid 1980s.

== History ==
Rachel Bell left Fort William with her sister Gaye as soon as their "last exam was finished” to move to Edinburgh and form a band. The early line-up included their father, Norman Bell, on drums and Teen from punk outfit The Ettes.

"All we wanted to do was get a band together, but none of us could be bothered learning an instrument. It was easier to become a singer."

— Rachel Bell, vocalist.

=== Early success ===
Radio DJ, John Peel, championed the Twinsets and they recorded three Peel sessions. The band quickly became a mainstay on the university circuit in the early 1980s, earning £3000 a gig. The band also performed gigs at the Edinburgh Nite Club on the same bill as the Peter Capaldi fronted, The Dreamboys. Aged 21, they also performed at Edinburgh’s Saughton prison.

"We were able to hire a full horn section, we got a van, we got a PA and we had more money than we knew what to do with... " - Rachel Bell.

Despite this, The Twinsets were never signed with a record label.

"I don’t think people knew what to do with us – we just sort of faded out," Bell said.

== Members ==
Members

- Gaye Bell - vocals
- Rachel Bell - vocals
- Dru Farmer - drums
- Nick Haines - guitar / piano
- Rory Hall - guitar
- Iain Carleton - guitar
- David Mack - drums
- Stuart Wright - drums
- Norman Bell - bass, drum

== Discography ==
=== Singles and EPs ===
- Twinsets - Heartbeat Cassette (1984)

=== Peel sessions ===
- Fourteen tracks recorded at 3 Separate BBC Peel Sessions in 1982 and 1983.

== Track listing ==
Track listing for Twinsets - three Peel sessions
No.	Title	Length
1.	"I'll Remember You"
2.	"Stranded In The Jungle"
3.	"Suspicious Minds"
4.	"Johnny Come Home"
5.	"Zippo"
6.	"Sophisticated Boom-Boom"
7.	"Talk"
8.	"Out Of Nowhere"
9.	"Heartbeat"
10.	"Too Too Much"
11.	"Crush"
12.	"Glittering New Day"
13.	"Meant To Be"
14.	"Girl On Her Own"

== Later life and legacy ==
- Rachel Bell became a visual artist after the band disbanded.

In October 2005 the band reformed to take part in the John Peel Day Edinburgh event.

The Twinsets were featured in the 2024 documentary film, Since Yesterday, which traces the evolution of trailblazing Scottish girl groups and female-led bands and includes personal anecdotes from the band members. The film was shown at the sold out Closing Night film at the 2024 Edinburgh International Film Festival and a special screening at the Cameo cinema on 18 October 2024 included a live introduction and Q&A with Gaye and Rachel Bell.

For director, Carla Easton, the whole germ of the idea for the documentary started with The Twinsets after she stumbled upon them during her undergraduate course. The more she started researching into them, the more they seemed like "a really cool band, but you couldn’t find the music anywhere." This was despite The Twinsets having had support from the influential English radio DJ John Peel, and regularly touring the UK.

“I remember stumbling upon the Ettes and Twinsets when I was doing my undergrad in 2006, and just trying to hoover up as much information about them as I could... what you did mattered to all the women making music today. You and your music haven’t been forgotten.”

Carla Easton, director of Since Yesterday.
