= Since Yesterday (film) =

- Directed by: Blair Young, Carla J Easton, Mark Thomas, David Harron
- Produced by: Beth Allan, Sinéad Kirwan
- Starring: The Mckinleys, The Ettes, Strawberry Switchblade, The Twinsets, Sunset Gun, His Latest Flame, Sophisticated Boom Boom, Hello Skinny, Lung Leg, Melody Dog, Sally Skull, The Hedrons, Carla J. Easton
- Edited by: Blair Young, Lindsay Watson
- Production company: The Forest of Black https://forestofblack.co.uk/
- Distributed by: Cosmic Cat
- Release date: 2024
- Running time: 94 minutes
- Country: Scotland

Since Yesterday is a 2024 Scottish documentary film. It tells the story of the women who pioneered as members of all-girl bands in Scotland from the 1960s-2010s and asks the questions 'why are they not remembered?' and 'what would have happened if they were?'. It takes a critical look at the structural barriers and risks female musicians face in the music industry.

== Themes and funding ==
Focusing on the celebration of girl-bands and their importance to cultural history and emphasizing the value of togetherness and female solidarity, the film also shines a light on the latent misogyny the women experienced. The film features interviews and personal anecdotes, reflections and archival performance clips from many of the artists and is narrated by Carla Easton of Teen Canteen

The film was funded with support from Screen Scotland and a crowd-sourced campaign.

== Release ==
The film had its premier at the 2024 Edinburgh Film Festival. and a limited release of screenings UK wide in October 2024.

== Featured bands ==
Bands included in the documentary include:

- The McKinley Sisters
- The Ettes
- Strawberry Switchblade
- The Twinsets
- Sunset Gun
- His Latest Flame
- Sophisticated Boom Boom
- Hello Skinny
- Lung Leg
- Melody Dog
- Sally Skull
- The Hedrons
