= Futuristic Retro Champions =

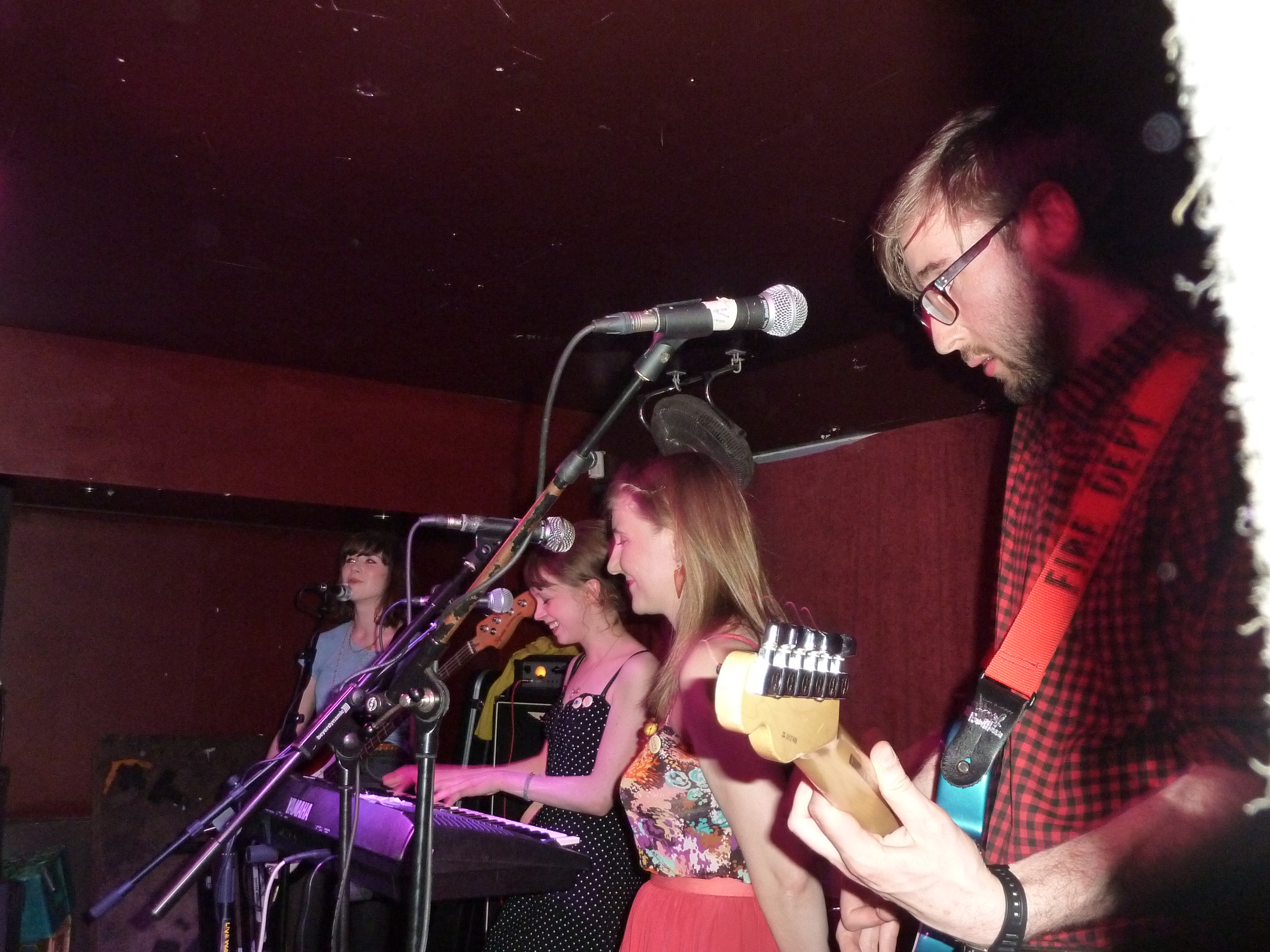

Background information
- Origin: Edinburgh, Scotland
- Genres: Electropop
- Years active: 2006–2011
- Members: Sita Pieraccini; Carla Easton; Harry Weeks; Cecilia Stamp
- Past members: Luke Fletcher; Dan O'Neill; Adam Scott

Futuristic Retro Champions were a Scottish indie band from Edinburgh and Glasgow from 2006-2011.

== History ==
Futuristic Retro Champions played their debut public gig at Edinburgh's Wee Red Bar in 2006, having met as students at Edinburgh College of Art.

On 21 October 2010, the band announced on Facebook and Twitter the December launch (at shows in Glasgow and Edinburgh) of a "Retrospective" album featuring all songs recorded to date; and also that they would "... not be continuing into 2011." Then on 20 November, another announcement said bassist Ceal had suffered a shattered elbow, and the farewell/album party gigs would have to be postponed until 2011.

Their 26-track, 2-CD debut/retrospective album 'Love And Lemonade' was released in April 2011.

== Band Name ==
Interviewed in the Jez Curnow movie The Art School Dance, Carla Easton revealed that she and her brother were in a school contest to coin "the best band name", and Futuristic Retro Champions is what they arrived at. Easton decided that if ever she were in a band, that would be its name.

== Band members ==
- Sita Pieraccini – vocals and melodica, tambourine (2006–2011)
- Carla Easton – keys, vocals, saxophone (2006–2011)
- Harry Weeks – guitar, vocals, synths, laptop, production (2006–2011)
- Cecilia Stamp – bass, vocals (2008–2011)

=== Former members ===
- Luke Fletcher – bass (2006–2008)
- Dan O'Neill – trumpet (2006–2008)
- Adam Scott – synths, shouting (2006–2008)
