= Ganger (band) =

Scottish alternative rock/post rock band

- Origin: Glasgow, Scotland
- Genres: Post-rock
- Years active: 1995–1999
- Labels: Domino, Guided Missile
- Past members: Graham Gavin; Stuart Henderson; James A. Young; Lucy McKenzie; Steven Clark; Martin Allen; Caroline Kraabel; Craig B Natasha Noramly
- Website: http://www.ganger.co.uk/

Ganger were a post-rock band from Glasgow, Scotland, with members who also played with Bis, Aereogramme, and Fukuyama.

== History ==
The band was formed in early 1995 by bass guitarists Graham Gavin and Stuart Henderson, along with drummer James A. Young, guitarist Lucy McKenzie, and Steven Clark (a.k.a. Sci-Fi Steven) of Bis on drums and keyboards. The band showed obvious influences from Krautrock bands such as Faust, Neu!, and Ash Ra Tempel, and their debut EP Half Nelson was released in 1996 on Glasgow label Vesuvius. Two further EPs followed that year, The Cat's in the Bag...the Bag's in the River, and the Domino Records 'Series 500' release Hollywood Loaf. Continuing on Domino, and now with Martin Allen replacing Clark and Caroline Kraabel added on saxophone, the band's debut album Fore was issued in 1997, collecting tracks from the early singles. Henderson and Young then recruited a new line-up of Craig B (guitar, vocals) and Natasha Noramly (bass), both formerly of Fukuyama. The band released two more singles with this lineup before the release of their second album Hammock Style in 1998, which saw comparisons with Tortoise and Slint, and was followed by a US tour with Mogwai. Craig B left to form Aereogramme, and after the band's third album, Canopy, was recorded, the band split up.

== Discography ==
=== Singles, EPs ===
- Half Nelson EP (1996) Vesuvius Records
- The Cat's in the Bag...the Bag's in the River EP (1996) Planet
- Hollywood Loaf EP (1996) Domino Series 500
- "Trilogy – D" (1998) Soul Static Sound
- "Trilogy – The Underdog" (1998) Soul Static Sound
- "Trilogy – Two Lone Swordsmen" (1998) Soul Static Sound
- "Geocities" (1998) Domino
- With Tongue Twisting Words EP (1998) Domino

=== Albums ===
- Fore (1997) Domino
- Hammock Style (1998) Domino
- Canopy (1999) Guided Missile
