= How to Solve Our Human Problems =

Compilation album by Belle and Sebastian
- Released: 16 February 2018
- Recorded: 2016–2017
- Genre: Indie pop
- Length: 69:18
- Label: Matador
- Producer: Various

Belle and Sebastian chronology
Girls in Peacetime Want to Dance (2015)	How to Solve Our Human Problems (2018)	Days of the Bagnold Summer (2019)

Professional ratings
Aggregate scores
Source	Rating
Metacritic	71/100
Review scores
Source	Rating
AllMusic	3.5/5 stars
Rolling Stone	3.5/5 stars

How to Solve Our Human Problems is the collective title of three EPs by the band Belle and Sebastian, released through Matador Records between 2017 and 2018. The EPs were eventually compiled as a compilation album on 16 February 2018.

== Track listing ==
All tracks are written by Belle and Sebastian, except "Best Friend" by Stuart Murdoch and Carla Easton

How to Solve Our Human Problems EP 1
No.	Title	Producer(s)	Length
1.	"Sweet Dew Lee" (Stevie Jackson and Murdoch on vocals)	Belle and Sebastian; Stuart Evans; Emily MacLaren	6:29
2.	"We Were Beautiful"	Belle and Sebastian; Brian McNeill	5:37
3.	"Fickle Season" (Sarah Martin on vocals)	Belle and Sebastian; Leo Abrahams	4:03
4.	"The Girl Doesn't Get It" (Murdoch and S. Martin on vocals)	Belle and Sebastian; Brian McNeill	4:49
5.	"Everything Is Now"	Belle and Sebastian; Paul Savage	5:28

How to Solve Our Human Problems EP 2
No.	Title	Producer(s)	Length
6.	"Show Me the Sun" (Murdoch and S. Martin on vocals)	Inflo	3:53
7.	"The Same Star" (S. Martin on vocals)	Leo Abrahams	3:35
8.	"I'll Be Your Pilot"	Belle and Sebastian; Brian McNeill	4:16
9.	"Cornflakes" (Jackson on vocals)	Belle and Sebastian; Stuart Evans; Emily MacLaren	4:26
10.	"A Plague on Other Boys"	Leo Abrahams	5:03

How to Solve Our Human Problems EP 3
No.	Title	Producer(s)	Length
11.	"Poor Boy" (S. Martin and Murdoch on vocals)	Belle and Sebastian; Inflo	4:28
12.	"Everything Is Now (Part Two)"	Belle and Sebastian; Paul Savage	5:39
13.	"Too Many Tears" (Celia Garcia, Therese Martin, Anna Miles and Murdoch on vocals)	Belle and Sebastian; Brian McNeill	4:27
14.	"There Is an Everlasting Song"	Belle and Sebastian; Brian McNeill	3:24
15.	"Best Friend" (Carla Easton on vocals)	Belle and Sebastian; Brian McNeill	3:41

== Charts ==
Chart performance for How to Solve Our Human Problems
Chart (2018)	Peak position
Austrian Albums (Ö3 Austria)	37
Belgian Albums (Ultratop Flanders)	129
Belgian Albums (Ultratop Wallonia)	118
Dutch Albums (Album Top 100)	72
German Albums (Offizielle Top 100)	27
Portuguese Albums (AFP)	13
Scottish Albums (OCC)	6
Spanish Albums (Promusicae)	29
Swiss Albums (Schweizer Hitparade)	27
UK Albums (OCC)	28
UK Independent Albums (OCC)	3
