= Randolph's Leap (band) =

Scottish indie-pop band

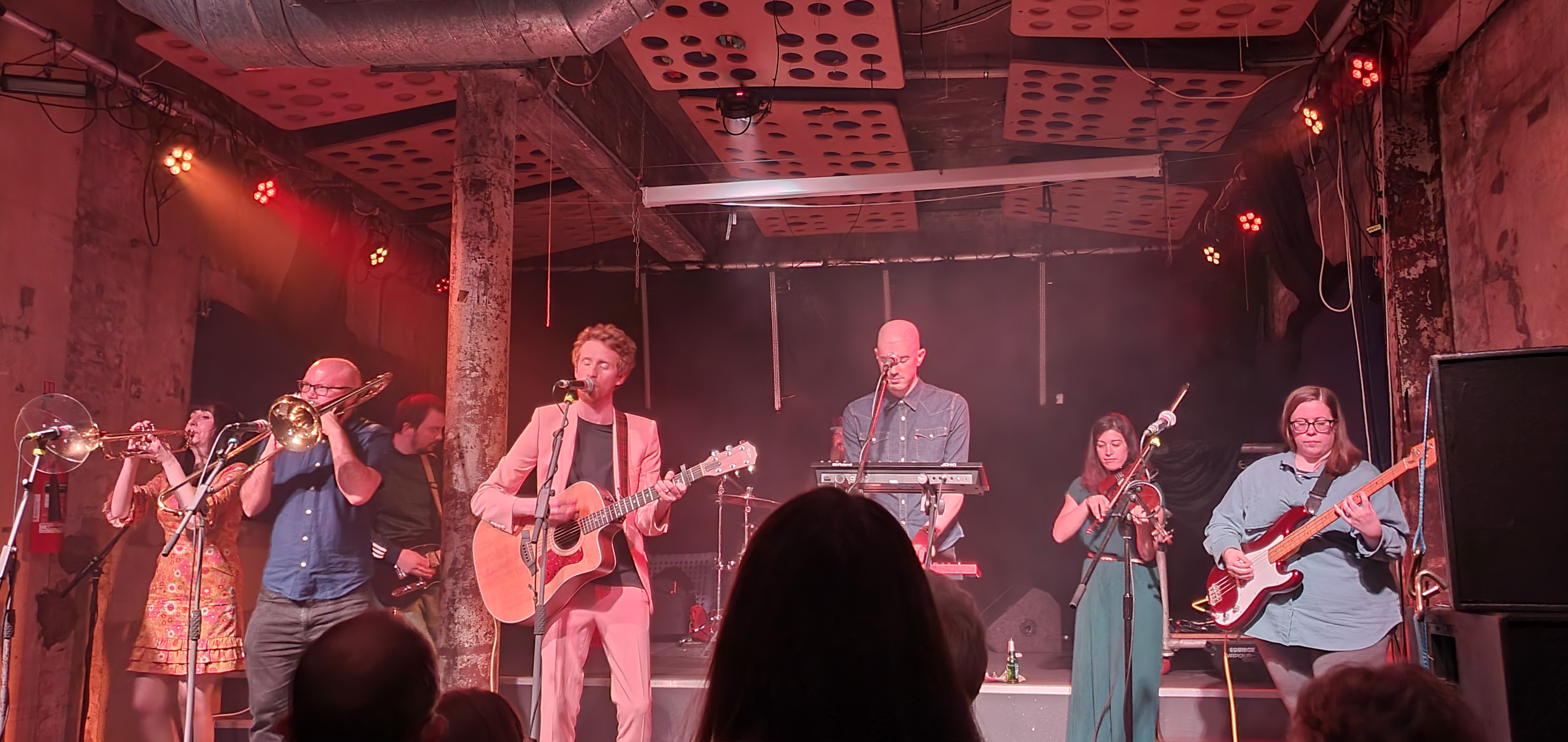
- Randolph's Leap in 2022

Background information
- Origin: Glasgow, Scotland
- Genres: Indie pop
- Years active: 2006–present
- Labels: Lost Map Records, Olive Grove Records, Peenko Records, Fence Records, Fika Recordings
- Members: Adam Ross, Adam Armour-Florence, Vicki Cole, Andrew MacLellan, Heather Thikey, Pete MacDonald, Ali Hendry, Fraser Gibson
- Past members: Gareth Perrie, Iain Taylor
- Website: RandolphsLeap.co.uk

Randolph's Leap is an eight piece indie-pop band from Glasgow, Scotland, and signed to Lost Map Records as of 2014. Founded by frontman Adam Ross in 2006, members include Ross (guitar/vocals), Adam Florence (drums), Vicki Cole (bass), Andrew MacLellan (guitar), Heather Thikey (violin), Pete MacDonald (keyboards), Ali Hendry (trumpet) and Fraser Gibson (trombone).

The band has released regular EPs, singles, and LPs since 2010, with their official debut album Clumsy Knot released in 2014. Susan Le May of The Quietus wrote that "the album moves from whimsical, earnest folk romanticism to introspection and Casio-frilled irony," and that it "marks the arrival proper of the next generation of witty Scottish indie pop." The band tours frequently in the UK, having performed at festivals such as Howlin' Fling, Belladrum, Mugstock and The Fringe.

== History ==
=== 2006–2011: Formation and early years ===
Randolph's Leap were formed in 2006 when lead singer Adam Ross (originally from Nairn, Scotland) met Gareth Perrie (from Dunblane) at The University of the West of Scotland in Ayr. Around 2009 the band expanded to a six-piece with the addition of Vicki Cole on bass (from Aberdeen, Scotland), Heather Thickey on violin (also from Aberdeen), Iain Taylor on drums (from Dumfries) and Andrew MacLellan on guitar and cello (from Crieff).

The band released their first EP, titled Battleships and Kettle Chips, on 15 November 2010 on Olive Grove Records. On 16 May 2011, they released a two-track single on Olive Grove, titled "Counting Sheep/Deep Blue Sea." In 2011 the live band expanded from a 6-piece to an 8-piece with the additions of Ali Hendry (trumpet) and Fraser Gibson (trombone).

=== 2012–2014: First albums ===
"Hermit" (2014)
About the song, The New Vinyl Villain wrote "the keyboards, violin, trumpet and trombone invoke marvelous memories of Dexy’s at the height of their powers but with lyrics that invoke the gentle humour and playfulness of Neil Hannon."

2012 saw the band greatly increase its output, and that year alone they released two full-length albums, three EPs, and the single "This Ain't It" via vinyl postcard. Their first LP came out on Peenko Records on 20 February 2012 and was titled The Curse of the Haunted Headphones. Peenko Records also released their EP As Fast As A Man that September, and in October 2012 the band released the EP Hermit on Fence Records. with the band placing 16th in the Hype Machine's UK Music Blog Zeitgeist which was announced on BBC 6Music. In 2013, Gareth Perrie left the band and was subsequently replaced by Pete MacDonald from the State Broadcasters. MacDonald had first-hand knowledge of the band as he had helped produce their upcoming album Clumsy Knot in 2013. While working on their new album, the band signed to Lost Map Records which was formed following the dissolution of the band's former label Fence Records in 2013.

==== Clumsy Knot ====
Clumsy Knot navigates western coasts, through forests, over sands and up mountains with self-doubt as Sherpa, a support team of brass and strings, and a pack laden with clever lyrics and sweet melodies. The album moves from whimsical, earnest folk romanticism to introspection and Casio-frilled irony, jaunty keys, sax solos, bass-heavy indie disco floor filling power pop and bursts of orchestral cacophony.

— The Quietus in 2014

The band's "first official" LP, titled Clumsy Knot, was released on 7 April 2014 on Lost Map Records. Several of the thirteen tracks are re-workings of songs from on their previous lo-fi recordings, and while approximately half of the songs were home-recorded, Alfred Archer of FolkRadio.co.uk wrote that the album "as a whole sees a marked step up in production from their previous work." Archer further called the album "thoughtful, funny and uplifting," while David Pollock of The Scotsman gave similar praise, writing in a largely positive review that the album "is light of touch and cheerful of spirit." Susan Le May of The Quietus wrote that "the album moves from whimsical, earnest folk romanticism to introspection and Casio-frilled irony," and that it "marks the arrival proper of the next generation of witty Scottish indie pop." While promoting the new album the band performed at several Scottish festivals in 2014, including Howlin' Fling on Eigg, Belladrum, and The Fringe. They also toured with other bands on the Lost Map label, including Kid Canaveral. The band also released a video for the single, "Weatherman", featuring former BBC weatherman Michael Fish.

=== 2014–present ===
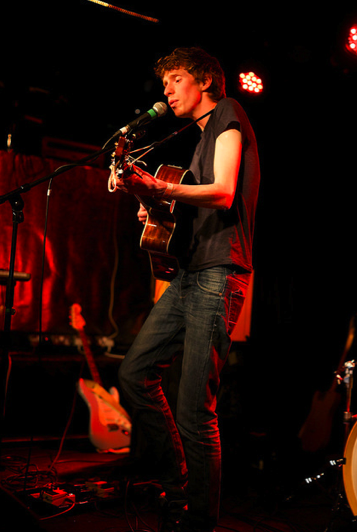
Frontman Adam Ross in 2014

The band have recorded two sessions for Marc Riley's BBC 6Music show, plus two for BBC Radio Scotland, one for the Vic Galloway show and one for Tom Morton. They have recorded numerous sessions for local radio including Moray Firth Radio in Inverness, plus the Daily Record newspaper. In June 2014, the band made a live TV appearance on the Riverside Show on STV Glasgow. They were interviewed by the BBC in 2014, also performing another live session. In June 2014, the band's single "I Can't Dance To This Music Anymore," first included on their old album The Curse of the Haunted Headphones, was released through Lost Map's postcard series of mail-order singles. Clash Music called the song a "joyous folk-pop romp" and "deeply Scottish in its ability to turn melancholy into joy." The band's second album, titled Cowardly Deeds, was released on 20 May 2016 on Olive Grove Records, followed by their third, titled Worryingly Okay, released on 25 May 2018 on Lost Map Records.

2018 saw the premiere of The Isle of Love, a play by Right Lines Productions, written by Euan Martin and Dave Smith, directed by Mark Saunders and based on songs by Adam Ross. The Isle of Love was billed by its writers as a "bittersweet tale of love, loss, recovery and discovery". The play explored the beauty and restorative qualities of island life and why people choose to visit, to stay, to leave and to return. The production toured all over Scotland in the spring of 2018 and starred John Kielty, Deborah Arnott, Ross Allan, Amy McGregor and Kevin Lennon. In conjunction with the Isle of Love theatre tour, the band released a compilation album of the same name, containing 21 songs from the band's back catalogue. The band's next studio album was Spirit Level in early 2021, released by Fika Recordings. The album was well received with The Scotsman giving it four stars and Is This Music saying that it is the best attempt yet at capturing the full band sound.

== Style ==
According to FolkRadio.co.uk in 2014, "The band’s slightly ramshackle, whimsical, indie style, together with their Glasgow base, makes comparisons to Belle and Sebastian unavoidable, though, at times there are also hints of Camera Obscura, Polyphonic Spree and The Magnetic Fields. It is Ross’s lyrics, which manage to be both humorous and heartbreaking, that sets the band apart from these influences." About Ross's songwriting and vocals, The Quietus wrote that "The driving force and linchpin of the group, [Adam Ross] is a songwriter who is both honest and charming, combining the strut and humour of Neil Hannon, the sincerity, vulnerability and softness of Stuart Murdoch and the lyrical wit and musical playfulness of the DIY Daddy, King Creosote himself."

== Members ==
Current

- Adam Ross - guitar/vocals (2006–present)
- Adam Armour-Florence - drums (2016–present)
- Vicki Cole - bass (2009–present)
- Andrew MacLellan - guitar, cello (2009–present)
- Heather Thikey - violin (2009–present)
- Ali Hendry - trumpet (2011–present)
- Fraser Gibson - trombone (2011–present)
- Pete MacDonald - keyboards (2013–present)

Past

- Gareth Perrie - keyboards (2006-2013)
- Iain Taylor - drums/guitar (2009-2016)

== Discography ==
=== Albums ===
Albums by Randolph's Leap
Year	Album title	Release details
2012	The Curse of the Haunted Headphones	Released: 20 February 2012; Label: Peenko Records; Format: Cassette, digital
2012	Introducing Randolph's Leap	Released: 2 July 2012; Label: Self-released; Format: CD, digital
2014	Clumsy Knot	Released: 7 April 2014; Label: Lost Map Records; Format: CD, LP, digital
2016	Cowardly Deeds	Released: 20 May 2016; Label: Olive Grove Records; Format: CD, LP, digital
2018	Worryingly Okay	Released: 25 May 2018; Label: Lost Map Records; Format: CD, digital
2018	The Isle of Love	Released: 15 June 2018; Label: Self-released; Format: CD, digital
2021	Spirit Level	Released: 26 Feb 2021; Label: Fika Recordings; Format: CD, LP, digital

=== EPs ===
Extended plays and mini-albums by Randolph's Leap
Year	Album title	Release details
2010	Battleships and Kettle Chips	Released: 15 November 2010; Label: Olive Grove Records; Format: CD, digital
2012	As Fast As A Man	Released: 24 September 2012; Label: Peenko Records; Format: Mini-album, digital
2012	Hermit	Released: 26 October 2012; Label: Fence Records; Format: Digital
2012	The Way of the Mollusc	Released: 2012; Label: Self-released; Format: Digital
2013	Real Anymore	Released: 6 September 2013; Label: Olive Grove Records; Format: Mini-album, CD, digital
2013	Christmas EP	Released: 12 December 2013; Label: Self-released; Format: Digital
2013	Furtive Glances	Released: 20 April 2013; Label: Peenko Records; Format: Cassette (limited)

=== Singles ===
Incomplete list of songs by Randolph's Leap
Year	Title	Album	Label
2011	"Counting Sheep/Deep Blue Sea"	Single only	Olive Grove; 16 May 2011
2012	"This Ain't It"	Single only	Peenko (vinyl postcard)
2013	"News"	Single only	Self-released; 9 February 2013
2014	"Light of the Moon"	Single only	Lost Map
2014	"I Can't Dance To This Music Anymore"	Single only	Lost Map

== See also ==
- Category:Musical groups from Glasgow
