= Castlemilk High School =

Coordinates: 55.80138°N 4.22929°W

Location
- 223 Castlemilk Drive; Glasgow G45 9JY, G45 9JY; Scotland

Information
- Type: Comprehensive School
- Motto: Nothing but the best will do
- Established: 1990
- Head Teacher: Lynn Gibson
- Staff: 50.5 FTE
- Gender: Mixed
- Age: 11 to 18
- Enrolment: 430
- School Years: S1-S6
- Eco Schools Status: Bronze Award
- Website: http://www.castlemilkhigh.glasgow.sch.uk/

Castlemilk High School is a co-educational comprehensive secondary school located in Castlemilk, Glasgow, Scotland. It was established in 1990 from a merger of the district's two existing nondenominational high schools due to falling population figures, Glenwood Secondary (built 1958, which closed and was demolished, later replaced by a business park) and Grange Secondary (built 1968, which was used as the new campus for Castlemilk High). The campus was rebuilt in 2001 to a design for fewer pupils than its predecessor.

== Head Teacher ==
The current Head Teacher, Lynn Gibson, was appointed in June 2015. The previous Head Teacher, Diane King, retired in 2015. Prior to this, Head Teacher Brian McAlinden CBE, in the post from 2001, retired in June 2010. His replacement Donna McMaster moved on to Inveralmond Community High School in Livingston.
