= Sadie Docherty =

Scottish politician (born 1956)

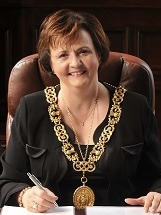
- Official portrait, 2012

Councillor, Glasgow City Council
- In office 3 May 2007 – 3 May 2017
- Preceded by: New ward
- Constituency: Linn

Lord Provost of Glasgow
- In office 17 May 2012 – 17 May 2017
- Preceded by: Bob Winter
- Succeeded by: Eva Bolander

Personal details
- Born: 6 June 1956 (age 70) Gorbals, Glasgow, Scotland
- Party: Scottish Labour
- Education: University of Strathclyde

Sadie Docherty (née Boyle; born 6 June 1956) is a Scottish politician who served as Lord Provost of Glasgow from 2012 to 2017.

She belongs to the Labour Party and previously sat as a councillor for Ward 1, Linn. She worked as a manager for the Glasgow Housing Association prior to becoming Lord Provost.

Docherty was born in the Gorbals area of Glasgow to Patrick and Margaret Boyle. At age 2, the family moved to Castlemilk. She was educated at Dougrie Terrace Primary School and St Margaret Mary's Secondary School before studying Public Administration at the Glasgow College of Technology and Scottish Local Authority Management at the University of Strathclyde.

Government offices
Preceded by Bob Winter	Lord Provost of Glasgow; 2012–2017	Succeeded by Eva Bolander
