= Sally Skull =

- Origin: Scotland
- Genre: Pop-punk • indie rock • garage rock • riot grrrl
- Years active: 1994–1999, 2015
- Past members: Clare Scrivener; Saskia Holling; Phil Bull; Katrina Dixon
- Website: https://sallyskull.bandcamp.com/

Sally Skull was a band from Scotland, formed in 1994. The band reformed in 2015 until Scrivener and Holling formed The Nettelles. They were influenced by garage and Riot grrrl.

Bassist and vocalist Saskia Holling was credited as a key figure in the Scottish scene in which the band performed and is considered one of the first promoters in Scotland to intentionally book all-women line-ups.

== Members ==
- Clare Scrivener (vocals, guitar)
- Saskia Holling (vocals, bass)
- Katrina Dixon (Drums)
- Phil Bull (Drums)

== Discography ==
- The 'Tantivy Tracks' EP (1995, Vesuvius)
- Fractious (EP, 1997, Slampt, Gnu-Sound Recordings)

== Legacy ==
Sally Skull were featured in the 2024 documentary film, Since Yesterday, which interviewed pioneering Scottish girl bands.
