= Anderston/City/Yorkhill (ward) =

Electoral ward in Glasgow, Scotland

Anderston/City/Yorkhill: Scottish Gaelic: Baile Aindrea/Cathair/Cnoc Eabhraig; Scots: Anderstoun/Ceitie/Yorkhull
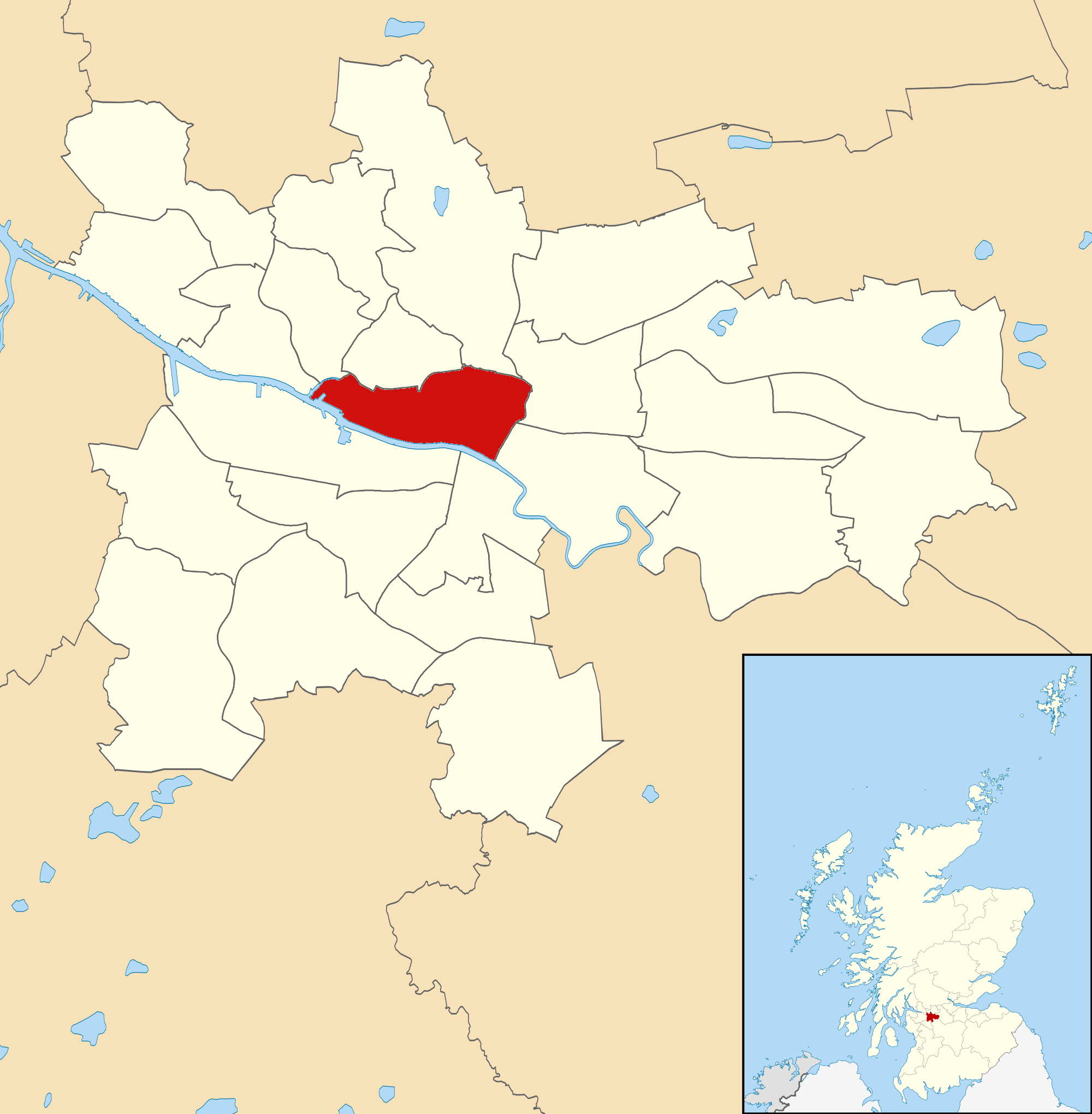
- Anderston/City/Yorkhill Ward (2017) within Glasgow

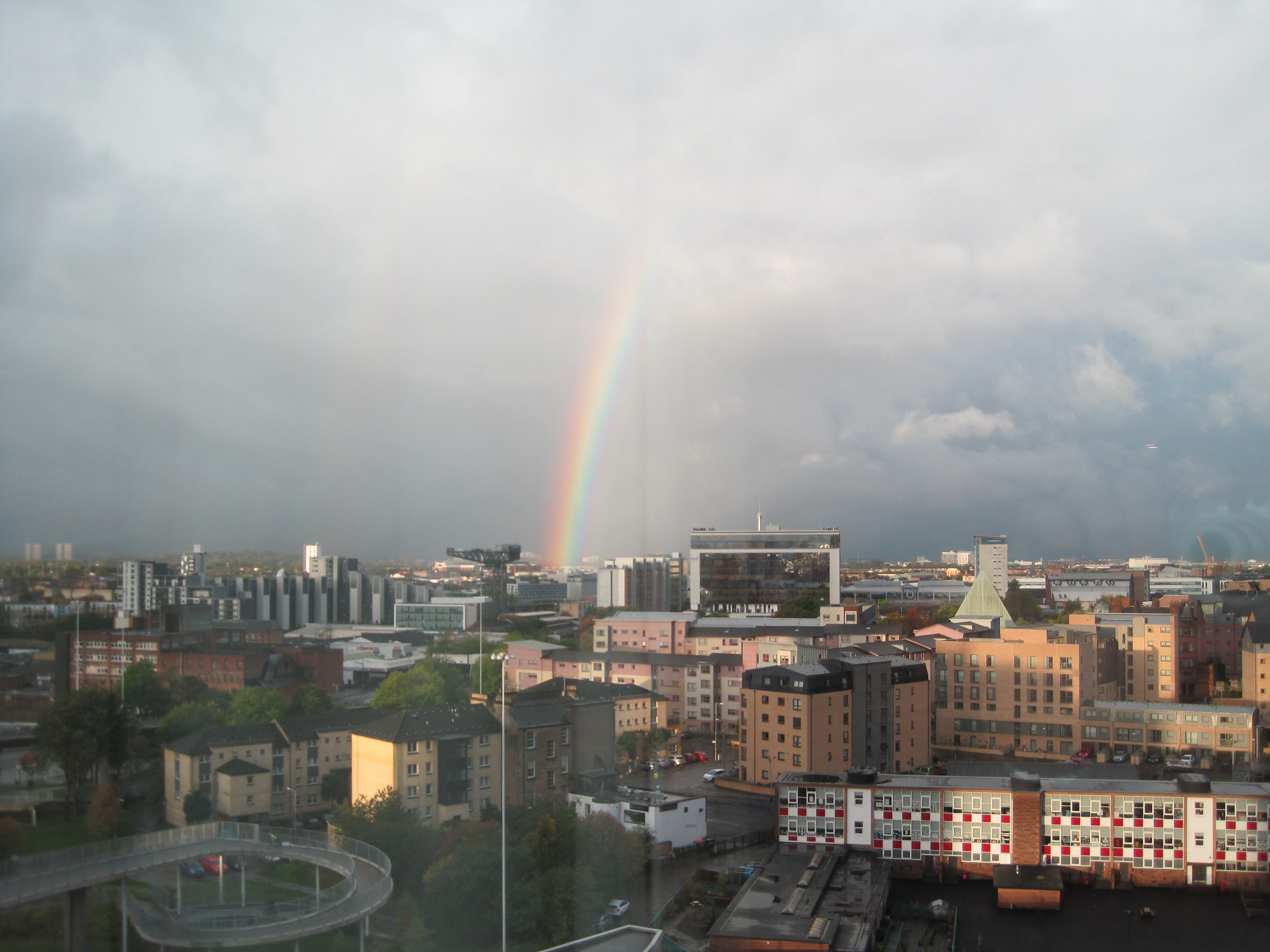
- View looking west over the Anderston and Finnieston areas within the Anderston/City/Yorkhill ward
- Area: 5.75 km^{2} (2.22 sq mi)
- Population: 30,184 (2015)
  - Density: 5,249.4/km^{2} (13,596/sq mi)
- Council area: Glasgow City Council
- Lieutenancy area: Glasgow
- Country: Scotland
- Sovereign state: United Kingdom
- Post town: GLASGOW
- Postcode district: G1, G2, G3
- Dialling code: 0141
- Police: Scotland
- Fire: Scottish
- Ambulance: Scottish

Anderston/City/Yorkhill (Ward 10) is one of the 23 wards of Glasgow City Council. Created as Anderston/City in 2007, it returned four council members, using the single transferable vote system. The same criteria applied in 2012. For the 2017 Glasgow City Council election, the boundaries were changed, the ward slightly decreased in size (although slightly increased in population) and was renamed Anderston/City/Yorkhill, still returning four councillors.

== Boundaries ==
The ward covers Glasgow city centre and the Merchant City which contain many office and retail premises but also some residential buildings, and also includes the more heavily populated areas of Cowcaddens, Garnethill and Townhead north of the city centre, along with the campuses of both the University of Strathclyde and Glasgow Caledonian University, with the M8 motorway being the northern boundary and High Street the eastern. The River Clyde forms the southern border of the ward, which stretches west through Anderston, Finnieston, Kelvinhaugh and Yorkhill to the River Kelvin.

The Kelvingrove residential area to the north of Finnieston lies within the ward, but Kelvingrove Park and the Park District which were also originally included in 2007 were reassigned to Hillhead ward in 2017. At that time the small Ladywell neighbourhood and the grounds of Glasgow Royal Infirmary were reassigned to a new Dennistoun ward. 'Yorkhill' was added to the name to better reflect the distribution of population, with most of the ward's residents living in areas west of Anderston.

The ethnic makeup of the Anderston/City/Yorkhill ward using the 2011 census population statistics was:

- 75.9% White Scottish / British / Irish / Other
- 18.1% Asian (mainly Chinese)
- 2.8% Black (mainly African)
- 3% Mixed / Other Ethnic Group

== Councillors ==
Election	Councillors			
2007	Philip Braat (Labour)	Gordon Matheson (Labour)	Craig MacKay (SNP)	Nina Baker (Green)
2012	Philip Braat (Labour)	Gordon Matheson (Labour)	Martin John Docherty (SNP)	Nina Baker (Green)
2015 by	Philip Braat (Labour)	Gordon Matheson (Labour)	Eva Bolander (SNP)	Nina Baker (Green)
2016 by	Philip Braat (Labour)	Angus Millar (SNP)	Eva Bolander (SNP)	Nina Baker (Green)
2017	Philip Braat (Labour)	Angus Millar (SNP)	Eva Bolander (SNP)	Christy Mearns (Green)
2022	Philip Braat (Labour)	Angus Millar (SNP)	Eva Bolander (SNP)	Christy Mearns (Green)

== Election results ==
=== 2022 Election ===
2022 Glasgow City Council election

Anderston/City/Yorkhill – 4 seats
Party	Candidate	FPv%	Count									
Party	Candidate	FPv%	1	2	3	4	5	6	7	8	9	10
Green	Christy Mearns (incumbent)	25.8	1,527									
Labour	Philip Braat (incumbent)	24.4	1,439									
SNP	Eva Bolander (incumbent)	22.8	1,349									
SNP	Angus Millar (incumbent)	10.2	603	783	801	938	940	947	974	992	1,016	1,236
Conservative	Susan McCourt	6.7	395	399	408	410	418	422	431	463		
Labour	John Gerard Carson	5.7	337	401	597	606	610	616	629	712	900	
Liberal Democrats	Matthew James Clark	2.5	145	168	175	178	184	187	198			
Independent	Benn Rapson	0.8	48	64	64	65	69	83				
Independent	Carla Arrighi	0.6	36	39	39	41	45					
Scottish Libertarian	Nick Thomson	0.5	31	33	33	33						
Electorate: 21,667 Valid: 5,910 Spoilt: 180 Quota: 1,183 Turnout: 28.1%

=== 2017 Election ===
2017 Glasgow City Council election

Anderston/City/Yorkhill – 4 seats
Party	Candidate	FPv%	Count							
Party	Candidate	FPv%	1	2	3	4	5	6	7	8
SNP	Eva Bolander (incumbent)	26.47%	1,591							
Labour	Philip Braat (incumbent)	22.09%	1,328							
Green	Christy Mearns	18.32%	1,101	1,146	1,155	1,161	1,187	1,254		
SNP	Angus Millar (incumbent)	12.89%	775	1,072	1,078	1,080	1,090	1,098	1,127	1,224
Conservative	Cameron Stewart	9.88%	594	597	604	607	620	649	650	716
Labour	Faten Hameed	6.41%	385	394	470	472	476	510	520	
Liberal Democrats	James Harrison	2.51%	151	154	160	162	168			
Independent	Gerry Creechan	0.92%	55	61	65	76				
Independent	Gordon Keane	0.49%	30	31	32					
Electorate: 19,071 Valid: 6,010 Spoilt: 172 Quota: 1,203 Turnout: 32.4%

=== 2012 Election ===
2012 Glasgow City Council election

Anderston/City – 4 seats
Party	Candidate	FPv%	Count										
Party	Candidate	FPv%	1	2	3	4	5	6	7	8	9	10	11
Labour	Philip Braat (incumbent)	29.4	1,561										
Labour	Gordon Matheson (incumbent)	20.9	1,113										
SNP	Martin Docherty	19.9	1,057	1,122.3									
Green	Nina Baker (incumbent)	10.5	558	652.2	656.6	662.6	665.6	676.2	704.3	753.2	809	891.8	1,163.5
SNP	Craig MacKay (incumbent)	9.7	516	541.5	587.8	592.3	592.3	596	605.5	628.4	645.2	683.3	
Conservative	David Barnes	4.7	249	273.5	274.4	276.3	279.3	280.8	283.9	283.9	314.3		
Liberal Democrats	Ewan Hoyle	1.7	89	112.9	113.9	116	117.3	120	126.4	129.4			
Solidarity	Graham Campbell	1.7	89	110.9	112.1	113.2	113.2	115.3	118.3				
Pirate	Rob Harris	0.9	46	53.9	54.4	54.8	58.5	60.9					
Glasgow First	Alexander McDowell	0.4	20	30.8	31.2	32.4	36						
Britannica Party	James Moir Robertson	0.3	17	19.2	19.2	19.4							
Electorate: 23,063 Valid: 5,315 Spoilt: 191 Quota: 1,064 Turnout: 5,442 (23.60%)

==== 2015 by-election ====
On 14 May 2015, SNP Cllr Martin Docherty resigned his after having been elected as an MP for the constituency of West Dunbartonshire. A by-election was held on 6 August 2015 and was won by the SNP's Eva Bolander.

Anderston/City by-election (6 August 2015) - 1 Seat
Party	Candidate	FPv%	Count					
Party	Candidate	FPv%	1	2	3	4	5	6
SNP	Eva Bolander	48.1%	1,441	1,444	1,446	1,457	1,473	1,750
Labour	Katie Ford	28.6%	857	857	866	881	943	1,024
Green	Christy Mearns	13.8%	414	414	421	442	467	
Conservative	Ary Jaff	5.5%	164	166	173	184		
Liberal Democrats	Gary McLelland	2.2%	66	68	70			
UKIP	Janice MacKay	1.4%	43	45				
Scottish Libertarian	Stevie Creighton	0.4%	12					
Electorate: 23,285 Valid: 2,997 Spoilt: 39 Quota: 1,499 Turnout: 3,036 (14.5%)

==== 2016 by-election ====
On 14 March 2016, Labour Cllr Gordon Matheson resigned his seat as he had been appointed a visiting professor at Strathclyde University. A by-election took place on 5 May 2016 and it was won by the SNP's Angus Millar.

Anderston/City by-election (5 May 2016) - 1 Seat
Party	Candidate	FPv%	Count				
Party	Candidate	FPv%	1	2	3	4	5
SNP	Angus Millar	43.03%	3,467	3,480	3,509	3,586	4,436
Labour	Steven Livingston	21.07%	1,698	1,715	1,793	2,112	2,603
Green	Christy Mearns	20.12%	1,621	1,637	1,710	1,869	
Conservative	Philip Charles	10.79%	869	908	965		
Liberal Democrats	Ryan Ross	3.08%	248	256			
UKIP	Karen King	1.91%	154				
Electorate: 20,995 Valid: 8,057 Spoilt: 133 Quota: 4,030 Turnout: 8,190 (39.18%)

=== 2007 Election ===
2007 Glasgow City Council election

2007 Council election: Anderston/City
Party	Candidate	FPv%	Count					
Party	Candidate	FPv%	1	2	3	4	5	6
SNP	Craig MacKay	23.65	1,632					
Labour	Philip Braat	18.71	1,291	1,306	1,318	1,328	1,366	1,421
Labour	Gordon Matheson (Note: Outgoing councillor for Merchant City single-member ward.)	17.06	1,177	1,194	1,200	1,220	1,259	1,291
Green	Nina Baker	12.75	880	927	974	1,033	1,163	1,247
Liberal Democrats	Ann Laird	11.68	806	836	866	890	929	1,050
Conservative	Erin Boyle	7.04	486	495	511	515	524	
Solidarity	Akhtar Khan	4.13	285	317	319	367		
Scottish Socialist	Peter Murray	2.87	198	215	228			
Independent	Dave Holladay	2.10	145	150				
Electorate: 20,431 Valid: 6,900 Spoilt: 130 Quota: 1,381 Turnout: 34.41%

== See also ==
- Wards of Glasgow
