= Castlemilk =

District of Glasgow, Scotland

Coordinates: 55.803033°N 4.235114°W

Castlemilk: Scottish Gaelic: Caisteal Mheilc
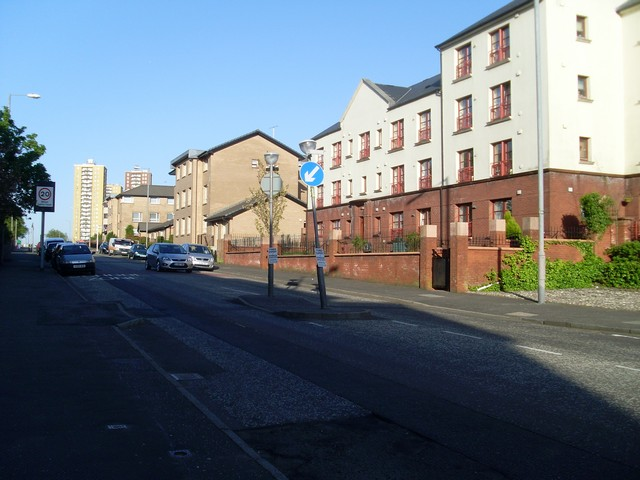
- Dougrie Road looking east (2009)

- Location within Glasgow
- OS grid reference: NS601591
- Council area: Glasgow City Council
- Lieutenancy area: Glasgow
- Country: Scotland
- Sovereign state: United Kingdom
- Post town: GLASGOW
- Postcode district: G45
- Dialling code: 0141
- Police: Scotland
- Fire: Scottish
- Ambulance: Scottish
- UK Parliament: Glasgow South
- Scottish Parliament: Glasgow Cathcart

Castlemilk (Scottish Gaelic: Caisteal Mheilc) is a district of Glasgow, Scotland. It lies to the south of the city, adjacent to Rutherglen (Spittal and Fernhill areas), Croftfoot, Simshill and the separate village of Carmunnock.

The area was developed by the Glasgow Corporation as a peripheral housing scheme in the 1950s to accommodate 34,000 people from inner-city slum areas such as the Gorbals. The new residents were provided with open spaces, a clean environment and indoor toilets and bathrooms. The modern development grew around Castlemilk House, a stately old mansion built around Cassilton Tower, which was started in 1460 on the site of a 13th-century castle, and was demolished in 1972.

The population fell from 37,000 in 1971 to roughly half that number in 1991. However, despite the social problems associated with poverty and unemployment, the area has seen the benefits of a regeneration strategy implemented in the 1980s which has focused on improved housing and the development of local arts. Community groups and Cooperative housing associations have done a lot to regenerate the housing and improve the amenities for local people. A swimming pool, sports centre, shopping arcade and community centres have been developed.

== History ==
=== Early history ===
Prior to the 20th century, Castlemilk was a rural estate in the parish of Carmunnock, centred on Castlemilk House. The latter was a much-altered tower house of 15th-century date, built by the Stewarts of Castlemilk. The Stewarts took their territorial designation from the lands of Castlemilk in Dumfriesshire, which lie along the Water of Milk. In 1579, they sold their Dumfriesshire estate and transferred the name Castlemilk to their Lanarkshire estate, which had previously been called Cassiltoun.

The estate remained in the hands of the Stewart (later Crawfurd-Stirling-Stuart) family until the 1930s, when it was purchased by the Glasgow Corporation. The old house was used for a time as a children's home, but was finally demolished in 1969.

=== Development of modern estate ===
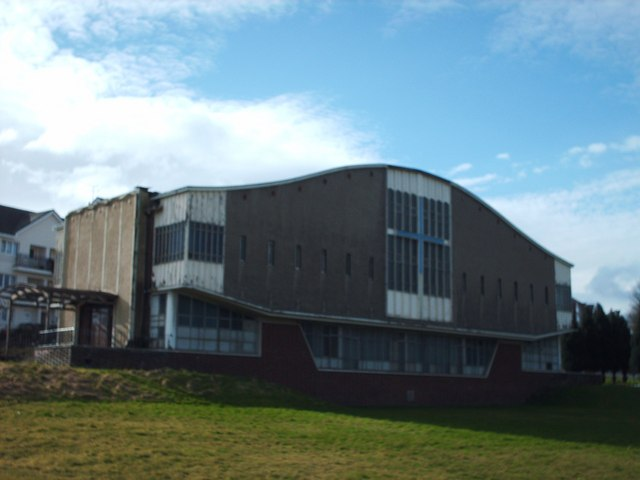
Castlemilk West Parish Church in 2008

Castlemilk and the other peripheral housing schemes in Glasgow had their origins in the city's housing crisis after the end of the Second World War. Many inner city areas such as Hutchesontown contained street after street of sub-standard tenement housing, and the city as a whole had a shortage of affordable good quality accommodation. The Castlemilk estate had already been acquired for building by the Glasgow Corporation under a compulsory purchase order in 1936 prior to the war.

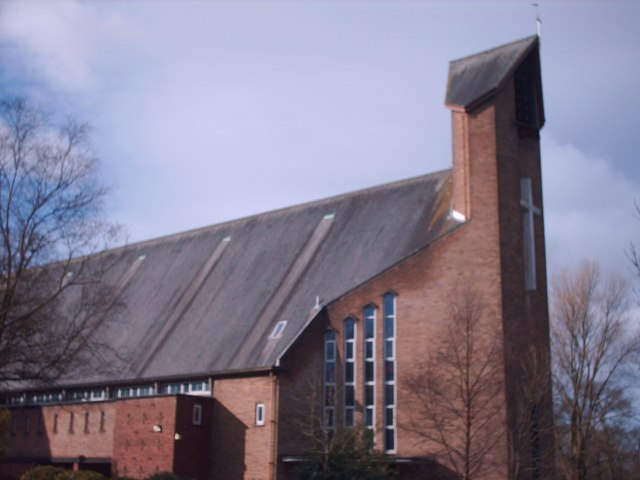
St. Margaret Mary's RC Church

In 1947, a delegation from Glasgow visited Marseille to see the new social housing designed by the Swiss-French architect Le Corbusier, who was a pioneer of modern urban planning. The group examined how his ideas could be applied to Glasgow with the proposed development of new “townships” on the outskirts of the city. Around the same time a second strategy was also formulated for the dispersal of the city's population, this being new towns such as East Kilbride (which is only a few miles across countryside from Castlemilk). However, the city fathers were anxious to ensure that most people remained living within the Glasgow boundaries so they keenly pursued the townships project even with limited space available on which to build. The other areas identified for this were Pollok, Drumchapel and Easterhouse – collectively referred to along with Castlemilk as "the big four".

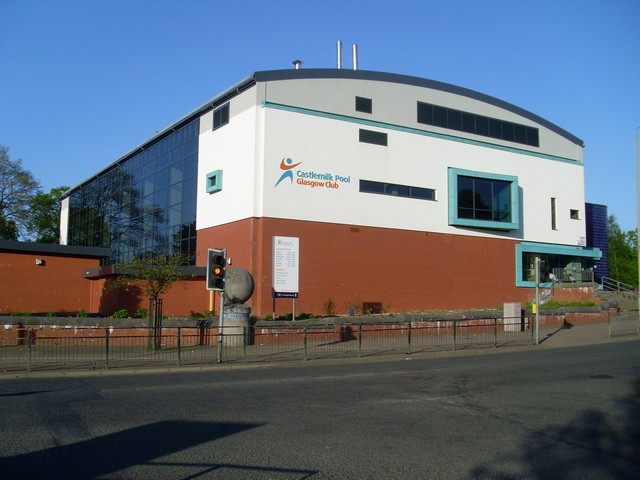
Castlemilk Swimming Pool

In December 1952, Glasgow Corporation approved a sketch layout plan for the construction of a new township at Castlemilk with an estimated cost of £16,000,000. It was planned to ultimately comprise some 8,300 houses. In early 1953, more detailed plans for the development of Castlemilk were prepared by Archibald George Jury, who had been appointed as Glasgow's first City Architect in 1951, a post he held until his retirement in 1972.

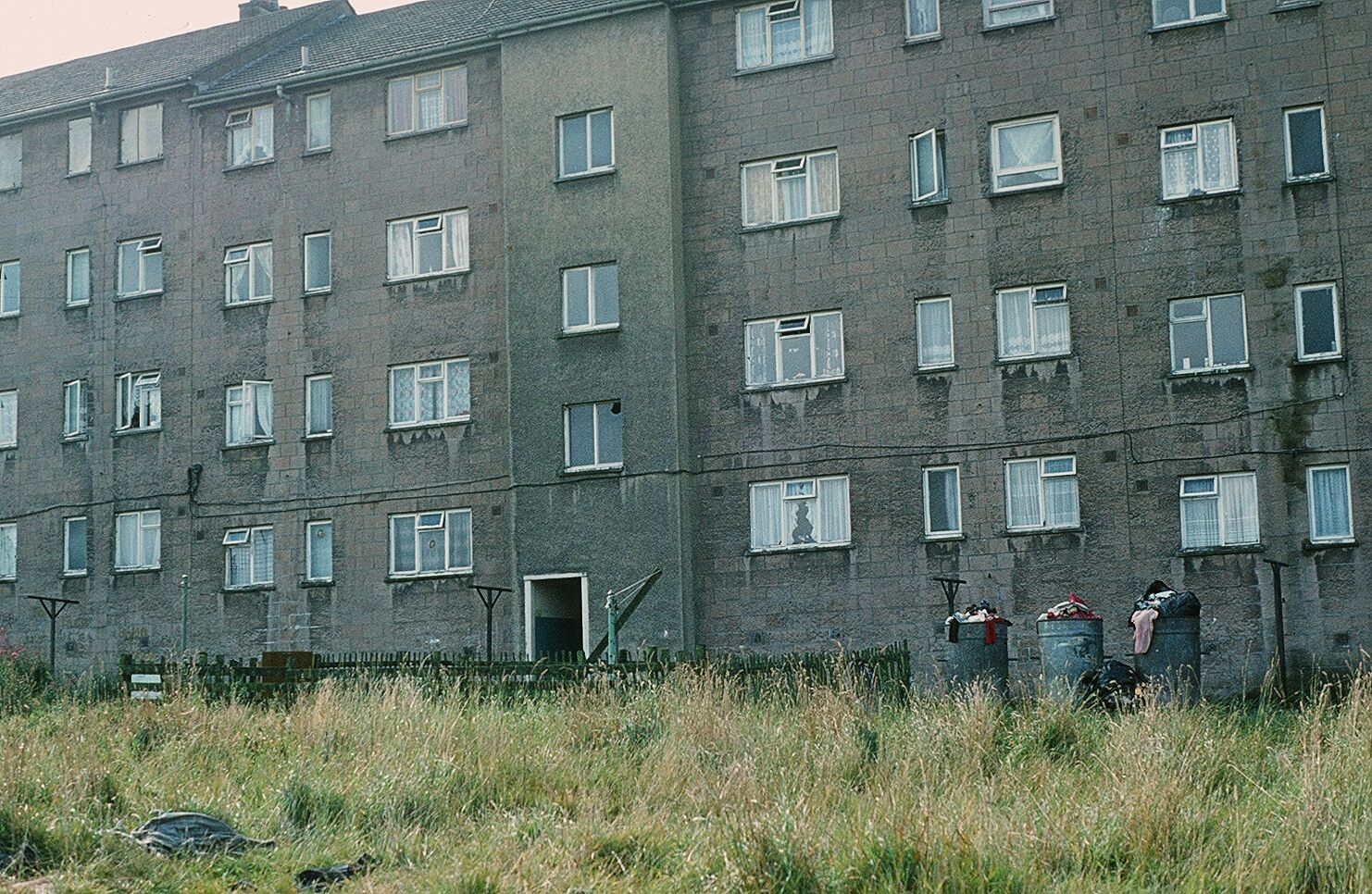
Rear of a typical 1950s Castlemilk tenement in 1983

There was a very limited range of different house types planned for the initial Castlemilk scheme. Most of the accommodation was to be contained in three or four-storey tenement blocks. There were also to be three-storey terraced houses intended for larger families and a few other house types designed for the elderly and other groups such as the local fire service personnel. The original 1950s flats, entered from common closes, seem to have been designed as modern versions of the traditional Glasgow tenements. Unlike many of the Victorian tenement dwellings, however, these flats came with interior bathrooms and running hot and cold water. Many of the street names (Ardencraig, Ardmaleish, Birgidale, Dougrie, Dunagoil, Machrie) were derived from rural locations in the County of Bute.

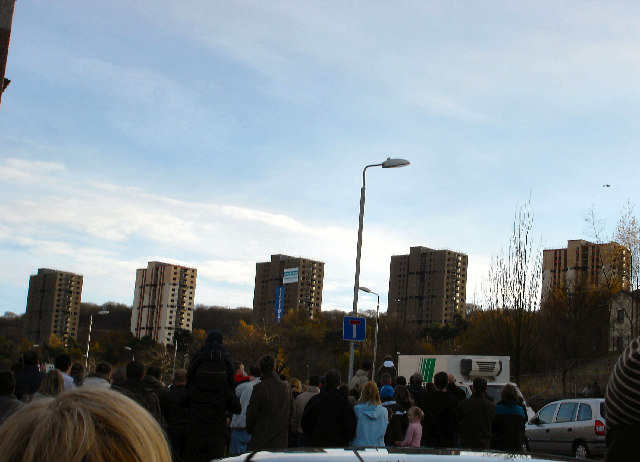
Mitchellhill tower blocks on the day of their demolition, 2005

The multi-storey blocks in Castlemilk did not arrive until the 1960s. Built after the added amenities that included: a swimming pool, the shopping arcade and the community centre. Archibald Jury was the architect responsible for the creation of the three 20-storey tower blocks in Dougrie Road, from the planning stage in 1960 to their completion in 1966 (these are still standing). The Mitchelhill high-rise blocks at Ardencraig Road, built on high and exposed ground at the edge of the Cathkin Braes and designed to be a prominent feature of the city skyline, were designed and built by George Wimpey Ltd, between 1963 and 1965 (they were demolished in 2005); Wimpey was also responsible for the construction of Bogany Flats in 1966 (demolished as early as 1993).

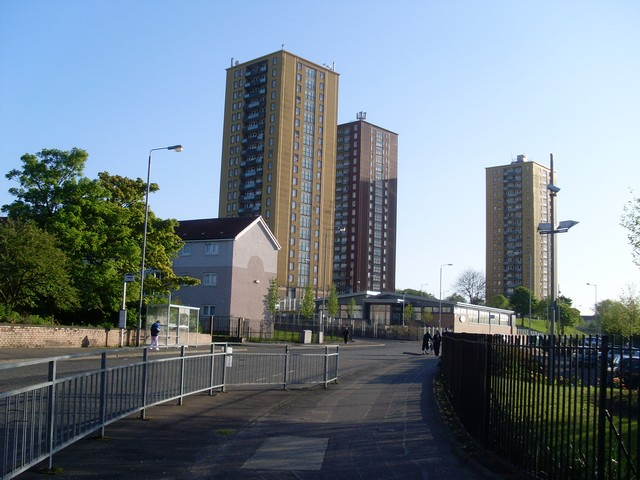
Dougrie Place flats, 2008

Public housing policy in Scotland was radically changed by the Tenants' Rights, Etc. (Scotland) Act 1980, which gave tenants the right to buy their council houses for the first time. Since then, renovation, demolition and refurbishment of Castlemilk’s existing housing stock has taken place, as well as the development of areas of new build houses for owner-occupation. Tenure has diversified with home ownership transferred from the City Council to local Housing Associations and owner-occupiers.

The township centre at Castlemilk Arcade / Dougrie Drive was developed by Ravenseft Properties Ltd between 1961 and 1963 on a 5-acre (20,000 m^{2}) site which was formerly the location of the large country houses at Castleton, west of Castlemilk House itself. The centre was designed to contain about sixty shops at an estimated cost of £3m to £4m. The shops are still standing, with an 80% occupancy rate. The north side of the arcade on Dougrie Drive contains Castlemilk's only pub, the Oasis. After the shopping centre's small Co-op Food supermarket confirmed it would close its doors in 2016, residents launched a campaign for improved grocery shopping provision in the district, with local bodies failing to attract any suitable tenants for either the Braes Centre (described by campaigners as badly outdated) or at any new standalone sites.

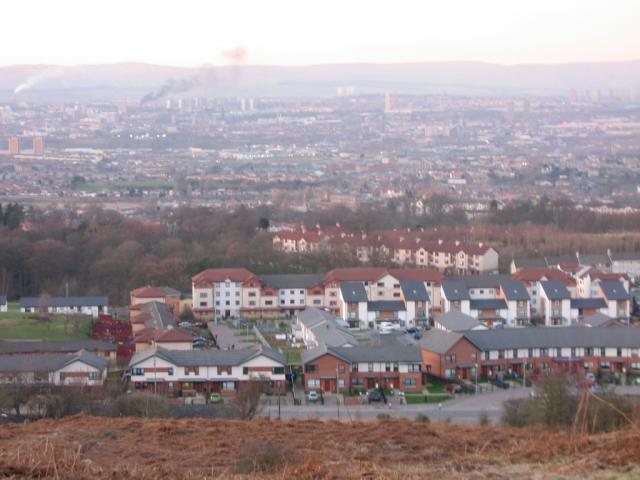
view north from Cathkin Braes over refurbished tenements and replacement houses

The original neighbourhood shops were built at the ground floors of the tenement blocks, following the old Glasgow pattern. Ownership of these small shops has been transferred from the Council to the Glasgow Housing Association, who have let the surviving blocks of shops in Stravanan Road and Tormusk Road to various tenants.

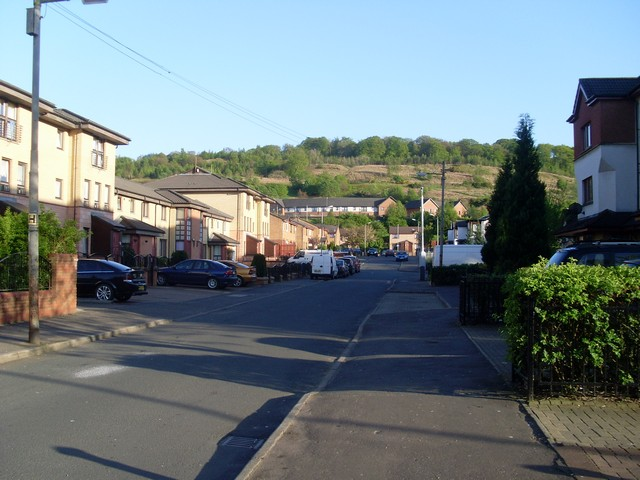
Modern housing looking south to Cathkin Braes

Castlemilk House was demolished in 1972 after being used as a children's home for several years and then falling derelict. The accompanying stables block (built 1794, designed by David Hamilton and Category B listed) survived and was restored; it now contains the local housing offices, community facilities and a nursery. The green areas between the clusters of housing, including the old features of the Castlemilk House estate, are managed as a Park and Woodlands, an award-winning project aimed to benefit the community.

Unlike some amenities, schools were in the Castlemilk plans from its conception. Eight primary schools served the area, with some of them closing and merging going into the 21st century – there are now four: Miller, Castleton, St Bartholomew's RC and John Paul II RC, plus one special school, Kirkriggs.

Glenwood Secondary School was the first of the scheme's three high schools to be constructed in 1958, followed by the (Catholic) St Margaret Mary's Secondary School in 1962 and Grange Secondary School in 1968. Falling population numbers led to Glenwood closing its doors in 1990 (a business centre now occupies the site) and the pupils transferring to Grange, which was renamed Castlemilk High School. In 2001 that school was rebuilt on a smaller scale on the same site, with the playground and buildings swapping places; St Margaret Mary's was reconstructed in 2002 using the same method. Some children living in the north-west of Castlemilk attend King's Park Secondary School in the neighbouring Simshill district, whilst the village school in Carmunnock is affiliated to Castlemilk High.

In 2001, the Reverend John D. Miller, minister of Castlemilk East Parish Church (from 1971 until his retirement in 2007), was elected Moderator of the General Assembly of the Church of Scotland. Miller Primary School in Castlemilk was named after him and his wife. As part of the regeneration of Castlemilk in 1999, several public artworks were commissioned and placed at prominent entrances into the area; these included works by sculptors Kenny Hunter and Rick Kirby.

== Notable residents, past and present ==
- Ikechi Anya, footballer
- Calvin Miller Footballer”
- Darren Brady, footballer
- Garry Brady, footballer
- Steve Bronski (Steven Forrest), musician (Bronski Beat)
- Jimmy Calderwood, football player and coach
- Gerry Cinnamon, singer-songwriter
- Sadie Docherty, politician, Lord Provost of Glasgow, 2012–2017
- Willie Donachie, footballer
- Islam Feruz, footballer
- Derek Forbes, bassist with Simple Minds
- Arthur Graham, footballer
- Jimmy Graham, footballer
- Tommy Graham, footballer
- James Grant (musician), musician, singer and songwriter and member of Love and Money
- Eddie Gray, footballer
- Frank Gray, footballer
- Hugh Hendry, investment manager
- Ray Houghton, footballer
- Stephen House, Police Scotland Chief Constable
- Rory Hughes, rugby player
- Dave King, businessman (Rangers F.C. owner)
- Gary Lamont, actor
- Frank Maguire, lawyer
- Libby McArthur, Singer and actor.
- James McCarthy, footballer
- Paul McCole, actor
- Stephen McCole, actor
- Bobby McCulley, footballer
- Aiden McGeady, footballer
- Jim McInally, footballer
- David McKay, actor
- Andy McLaren, footballer
- Charlie Miller, footballer
- Alex O'Hara, footballer
- William Ruane, actor
- Bernie Slaven, footballer
- Ricky Sbragia, football player and coach

== See also ==
- Glasgow tower blocks
