= Philip Braat =

Scottish Labour politician

Councillor Philip Braat
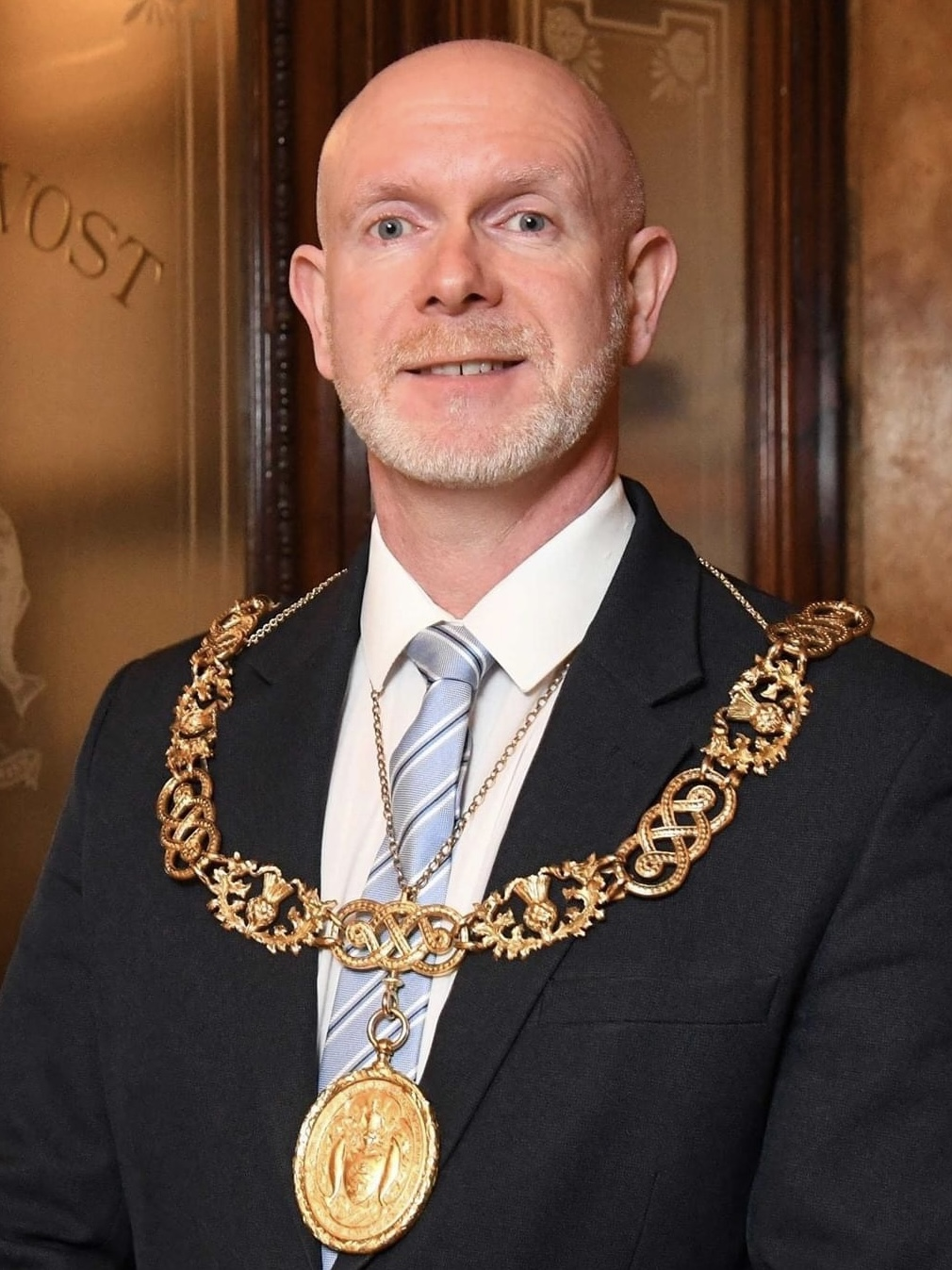
- Official portrait, 2020

Lord Provost of Glasgow
- In office 24 January 2020 – 19 May 2022
- Deputy: Christy Mearns
- Preceded by: Eva Bolander
- Succeeded by: Jacqueline McLaren

Deputy Lord Provost of Glasgow
- In office 18 May 2017 – 30 October 2019
- Leader: Eva Bolander
- Succeeded by: Christy Mearns

Councillor, Glasgow City Council
- Incumbent
- Assumed office 3 May 2007
- Constituency: Anderston/City/Yorkhill; Anderston/City (2015–17)

Personal details
- Born: 1976 (age 49–50)

Bailie Philip Braat (born 1976) is a Scottish Labour politician who served as the Lord Provost of Glasgow from 2020 until 2022. He previously served as Deputy Lord Provost from 2017 to 2020. He has represented the Anderston/City/Yorkhill ward since May 2007.

== Private life ==
Braat grew up in Essen, Belgium, and is a native speaker of both English and Dutch. In November 2024 it was reported that he was arrested and charged with stalking offences. A Police Scotland spokesperson at the time said: “A 48-year-old man was arrested and charged on Wednesday, 23 October 2024, in connection with stalking offences." A report was submitted to the procurator fiscal and he was expected to appear at Glasgow Sheriff Court at a later date. Braat was found guilty of stalking on 23 May 2025. Following his conviction, his official portrait was removed from Glasgow City Chambers.

== Career ==
=== Law career ===
Braat is a graduate of law from the University of Glasgow, specialising in Commercial Property Law. He has held a series of senior positions since his election to Glasgow City Council in 2007, including City Treasurer, Convener of Strathclyde Pension Fund and Convener of the former Strathclyde Police Authority. He is also an Honorary Officer in the Royal Navy Reserves.

=== Political career ===
Braat has served as a councillor on Glasgow City Council since 3 May 2007, representing the Anderston/City/Yorkhill ward for the Scottish Labour Party. He serves on the ward's Area Partnership, and on Emergency Committee and International Strategy Board committees within the council.

In 2017, he was appointed at Deputy Lord Provost of Glasgow and in 2020 was appointed as the Lord Provost, holding that office until 2022.
