= Vesuvius (UK record label) =

Vesuvius Records was a British independent record label, based in Glasgow, Scotland, between 1995 and 1998. The label signed small local bands.

Their first release In Spelunca, was a compilation showcase featuring The Yummy Fur, Lungleg, Sally Skull, Hello Skinny and others. Despite low production value, the record aimed to celebrate new bands from disparate backgrounds.

Founded jointly by band members and local artists and activists Pat Crook, Brian MacDougall, and illustrator Marc Baines, the label took care in every aspect of packaging and design often hand-printing and assembling records from their bedroom headquarters. Between 1995 and 1998, they released 18 records in various sizes (7", 10" and 12" vinyl), as well as CD, cassettes, and several comic books, founding a reputation for quality design and packaging with a highly illustrative style.

Having launched the careers of several local bands, notably Lungleg, The Yummy Fur and Ganger, in addition to supporting international acts like Half Japanese, Yo La Tengo and Dymaxion, the label wound down production and has been dormant in the 21st century.

== Discography ==
- Various Artists, In Spelunca, 10" (Pomp001)
- Sally Skull, Tantivy Tracks, 7" (Pomp002)
- Jad & David Fair, What Do You Want?, 7" (Pomp003)
- Ganger, Half Nelson, 12" (Pomp004)
- Various Artists, A Fistful of Horsepower, travel companion cassette & book (Pomp005)
- Jad & David Fair, Best Friends, CD (Pomp006)
- Lung Leg, Maid to Minx, LP/CD (Pomp007)
- The Yummy Fur, Supermarket, 7" (Pomp008)
- Dick Johnson, Free Gigi, 7" (Pomp009)
- Lung Leg, Right Now Baby, 7" (Pomp010)
- Dymaxion, Verfremsdungseffekt, 7" (Pomp011)
- The Yummy Fur, Male Shadow, 10"/CD (Pomp012)
- Various Artists, Spooky Sounds of Now, CD & book (Pomp013)
- Jad Fair, Jackpot, 7" & book, (Pomp014)
- Cylinder, Point of Sleet, 12" (Pomp015)
- Lung Leg / Make Up, Krayola/Pow to the People split, 7" (Pomp016)
