= Bob Winter =

British politician

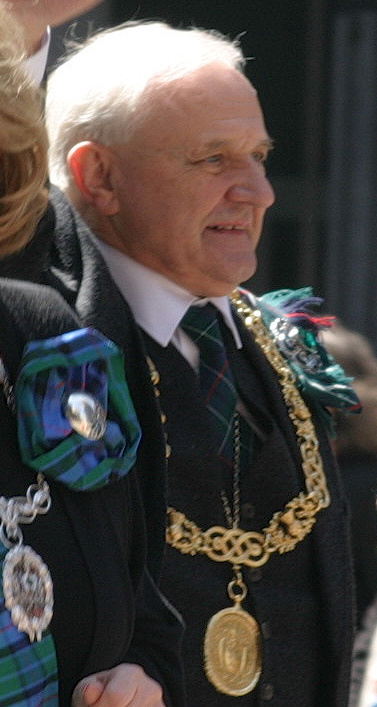
- Bob Winter in 2011 Tartan Day Parade in New York City

Robert Rickaby Winter CBE (born 31 March 1937) is a Scottish former politician who was Lord Provost of Glasgow from 2007 until 2012.

== Early life ==
Winter was born on 31 March 1937 in the Maryhill area in the north of the city and was educated at Allan Glen's School, the University of Glasgow, where he studied Public Administration, and what is now the University of Strathclyde, where he studied Social Work. He is married and has five children and seven grandchildren.

== Professional and non-executive career ==
Bob Winter was employed in Local Authority Social Work in the West of Scotland between 1954 and 1996, with breaks for National Service and university study. His career included roles from Welfare Officer to Director of Social Work Greenock and Port Glasgow. He was also the Divisional Director of Social Work (Glasgow), Depute Director Community Care and Director of Social Work at Strathclyde Regional Council until his retirement in 1996. He is also a Past President of the Association of Directors of Social Work, of which he was a founder member in 1969.

From 1996 to 2003, he served as a trustee of Greater Glasgow Primary Care NHS Trust. He was a lay Member of the General Medical Council (GMC) from 1996 to 2003, and an Associate Member from 2003 to 2007. While on the Council he chaired one of its fitness-to-practise panels. He was also Chairman of the Risk Management Authority from 2004 to 2008. Winter is currently a Member of the Court of Glasgow Caledonian University and a member of the Staff Policy Committee.

== Political career ==
After retirement from his career in Social Work, Winter took up politics, being first elected a Labour Councillor on Glasgow City Council in 1999, serving the Summerston ward. He was re-elected in 2003 and 2007, when he became of four councillors for Ward 15, which includes Maryhill and the Kelvin area of Glasgow's West End. As a Councillor, Winter served on a number of Committees and groups that allowed him to draw on his professional background. He was the Council Spokesperson for Children's Services and Chair of the North West Area Committee, Social Renewal Working Group, North Community Health & Care Partnership and the Maryhill Kelvin Canal Community Planning Partnership and Housing Forum. Following his re-election in 2007, Winter was nominated as Lord Provost by fellow Councillors on Glasgow's ruling Labour group.

== Honours and awards ==
Winter became an Officer of the Most Excellent Order of the British Empire (OBE) in 2012. Other honours and awards include Freedom of the City of London, Honorary Fellowship of the Royal College of Physicians and Surgeons of Glasgow, an Honorary Degree of Doctor of Glasgow Caledonian University, an Honorary Degree of Doctor of Strathclyde University and Honorary Fellowship of the Royal Incorporation of Architects in Scotland.

Government offices
Preceded by Liz Cameron	Lord Provost of Glasgow; 2007–2012	Succeeded by Sadie Docherty
