= St Margaret Mary's Secondary School =

Coordinates: 55°48′11″N 4°14′16″W

Location
- 9 Birgidale Road; Castlemilk, Glasgow G45 9NJ; Scotland

Information
- Type: Comprehensive secondary school
- Motto: 'Only The Best Will Do'
- Religious affiliation: Roman Catholic
- Headmaster: Elaine Seery
- Teaching staff: 52.9 FTE
- Enrollment: 411 (2014–15)
- Colours: Navy blue, black and white
- Nickname: 'Maggies'
- Website: Official Website

St Margaret Mary's Secondary School is a co-educational, Roman Catholic, comprehensive secondary school located in Castlemilk, Glasgow, Scotland.

== History ==
The school originally opened in 1962. The original buildings were demolished in 2002, with a new, smaller school opening in 2004. This was part of a widespread program of rebuilding and refurbishing schools throughout Glasgow by Glasgow City Council in a PFI program. St Oswald's Secondary School and St Margaret Marys Secondary School are now working together at the St Margaret Mary's Secondary School building. St Oswalds Secondary School moved into the St Margaret Mary's building.

== Notable former pupils ==
- Arthur Graham (b. 1952), footballer, Aberdeen F.C., Leeds United F.C., Manchester United F.C., Bradford City A.F.C. and the Scotland national football team.
- Sadie Docherty (b. 1956), politician, Lord Provost of Glasgow (2012-2017)
- Gerry Cinnamon (b. 1984), singer-songwriter
- William Ruane (b. 1985), actor
- James McCarthy (b. 1990), footballer, Hamilton Academical F.C., Wigan Athletic F.C., Everton F.C., Crystal Palace F.C., Celtic F.C. and Republic of Ireland national football team
