= Lucy McKenzie =

Scottish artist based in Brussels (born 1977)

- Born: 1977 (age 48–49); Glasgow, Scotland
- Education: DJCAD
- Alma mater: State Academy of Fine Arts Karlsruhe
- Notable work: The Quodlibet series
- Movement: Maximalism
- Awards: EAST; 1999
- Website: lucymckenzie.com

Lucy McKenzie (born 1977) is a Scottish artist based in Brussels.

== Biography ==
Born in Glasgow, McKenzie studied for her BA at Duncan of Jordanstone College of Art and Design in Dundee from 1995–1999, and at State Academy of Fine Arts Karlsruhe in Germany in 1998. During this time she played guitar in the post rock band Ganger.

McKenzie first came to prominence when she won the EAST award at EASTinternational in 1999 which was selected by Peter Doig and Roy Arden. She has since shown work in many exhibitions, such as “The Dictatorship of the Viewer” at the Venice Biennale, Becks Futures 2000 in London, Manchester and Glasgow and “Happy Outsiders” at Zacheta Gallery in Warsaw. She has exhibited internationally at galleries and museums including Tate Britain in London, Kunsthalle Basel in Switzerland and the Walker Art Center in Minneapolis.

In 2007 McKenzie stumbled upon a mention of the École Van der Kelen-Logelain of Brussels while browsing in a secondhand bookshop in Brussels and promptly signed up for the six-month course. Using the school’s illusionistic techniques she created large-scale paintings, like the "vertigo-inducing Untitled (2010)". These and a book she published about her experiences there are credited in helping revive interest in the declining school.

In 2013 McKenzie exhibited at Tate Britain in 'Painting Now: Five Contemporary Artists'.

The Art Institute of Chicago featured McKenzie in 2014 in an exhibition entitled focus: Lucy McKenzie.

The seventh season of The Artist's Institute at Hunter College, New York was dedicated to Lucy McKenzie, September 20, 2013 – February 2, 2014, describing her as an artist who "makes works drawn from the artistic lieu of the cities and social circles she inhabits. Early paintings appropriated the language of Alasdair Gray's Glasgow murals of the 1970s, while more recent projects have reconstructed archetypal domestic interiors by employing faux finishing techniques. McKenzie has also founded a record label, a bar, a fashion line, and is currently experimenting with the field of crime fiction."

She was a guest professor at the Kunstakademie Düsseldorf 2011-2013. In April 2025 an article on the Euronews website reported speculation that she was in fact the anonymous street artist Banksy.

== Exhibitions ==
- "Projects 88: Lucy McKenzie" Museum of Modern Art, New York, September 10-December 1, 2008
- "Lucy McKenzie" Museum Ludwig, Cologne, Germany, March 14-July 25, 2009

== Publications ==
- Neil Mulholland, "Dreams of a Provincial Girl," PARKETT 76, 2006
- Isabelle Graw, "On the Road to Retreat: An Interview with Lucy McKenzie," PARKETT 76, 2006
- Bennett Simpson, "Lucy McKenzie, Herself," PARKETT 76, 2006
