= Eva Bolander =

Scottish politician

Councillor, Glasgow City Council
- Incumbent
- Assumed office 6 August 2015
- Constituency: Anderston/City/Yorkhill; Anderston/City (2015–17)

Lord Provost of Glasgow
- In office 18 May 2017 – 30 October 2019
- Preceded by: Sadie Docherty
- Succeeded by: Philip Braat

Personal details
- Born: Stockholm, Sweden
- Party: Scottish National Party
- Children: 2

Eva Bolander is a Scottish National Party (SNP) politician. She sits as a councillor for the Anderston/City/Yorkhill ward, having first been elected in a by-election in 2015.

She was the Lord Provost of Glasgow, elected in May 2017, the first member of the SNP to hold this post.

In October 2019, she came under scrutiny for spending on shoes, clothes and cosmetics. The £8,000 she spent over 28-months in office was within the £5,000 annual allowance but it was still considered excessive by some of the public. The day after the figures were published, Bolander apologised, stating "Although the spending incurred was within the rules, on reflection there are items which I should not have chosen to reclaim" and stated that she would repay some of the money. In the wake of the criticism over her expenses claims, Bolander resigned as Lord Provost on 30 October 2019.

== Personal life ==
Born and brought up in Stockholm, Sweden, Bolander moved to Glasgow after the accession of Sweden to the EU in 1995. She had first visited Glasgow in the 1980s, competing in the World Pipe Band Championships, visiting the city regularly and later starting a relationship with a Scot which led her to relocate permanently.

Government offices
Preceded by Sadie Docherty	Lord Provost of Glasgow; 2017–2019	Succeeded by Philip Braat
