= Bogany Flats =

- Alternative names: 30 Bogany Terrace; The Hilton

General information
- Status: Demolished
- Type: Residential
- Architectural style: Brutalist
- Location: Castlemilk, Glasgow, Scotland
- Coordinates: 55°48′10″N 4°13′38″W
- Construction started: 1966
- Demolished: 28 March 1993
- Owner: Glasgow City Council

Technical details
- Structural system: Pre-cast Concrete
- Floor count: 20

Design and construction
- Main contractor: Wimpey

Bogany Flats was a multi-storey block of flats in Castlemilk, Glasgow. The flats were built in 1966 by George Wimpey Ltd, the last of the nine tower blocks Wimpey built throughout the city in the sixties. The building was 20 stories high and contained 114 dwellings; locally it was known as 'The Hilton'.

On 28 March 1993, 30 Bogany Terrace was demolished using 350 kg (770 lb) of explosives, in what was to become the third successfully controlled explosion in Glasgow. Despite being the most recently built high-rise tower block in Castlemilk it was the first to be demolished, after standing for only 27 years.

== See also ==
- Glasgow tower blocks
