= Frank Maguire (solicitor) =

Scottish solicitor

- Born: 4 October 1955
- Died: 17 September 2011 (aged 55)
- Education: St Vincent’s College, Langbank; St Mary’s College, Aberdeen; Pontificia Università Gregoriana, Rome (Bachelor of Philosophy); University of Aberdeen (Bachelor of Laws)
- Occupation(s): Solicitor, Managing partner Thompsons
- Known for: Advocate and campaigner
- Title: Solicitor of the Year 2010

Francis Thomas Maguire PHB (Philosophy, Magna Cum Laude), LLB, S.A., SSC, NP. (4 October 1955 – 17 September 2011) was a Scottish lawyer, joint managing partner of personal injury law firm Thompsons Solicitors, a solicitor advocate and a campaigner for the victims of injustice.

== Early life ==
Maguire, the fourth of seven children, spent his early years in Castlemilk, Glasgow and originally had no intention of being a lawyer.

His first choice of career was the priesthood, and he attended St Vincent’s College (Langbank) and St Mary’s College, Blairs, Aberdeen before studying philosophy and theology at the Pontificia Università Gregoriana in Rome, where he completed a Bachelor of Philosophy degree. Maguire then realised that he did not want to become a priest after all. He studied law at Aberdeen University instead, before joining Robin Thompson & Partners in Edinburgh as a trainee.

== Career ==
Maguire remained with Robin Thompson & Partners, now known as Thompsons Solicitors, throughout his legal career. In 2006 he became joint managing partner of the firm and was instrumental in leading it to five consecutive legal awards between 2008 and 2011. Maguire was the recipient of one of these awards himself, being named Solicitor of the Year at The Firm Magazine’s Scottish Law Awards in 2010. He was admitted as a solicitor advocate in 1994. During his career Maguire represented miners during the miners’ strikes, victims of the Piper Alpha Disaster, haemophiliacs infected with Hepatitis C and HIV (instigating the Penrose Inquiry) and many victims of asbestos exposure. He acted as solicitor advocate in several leading cases, in one fighting against the insurance industry Supreme Court challenge to the Damages (Scotland) (Asbestos-Related Conditions) Act 2009, and in another successfully arguing that the amount of damages awarded to the families of asbestos victims should be significantly increased. Maguire was also solicitor advocate in a series of cases that set a pattern for future damages awards to the immediate family of mesothelioma victims.

=== Campaigns ===
Maguire was both a well respected solicitor advocate and a campaigner for the victims of injustice. The Herald newspaper described him as a ‘campaigning Glasgow lawyer’ and ‘champion of the rights of shipyard workers and trade unions'. He brought about several major changes in legislation, including:

- The Damages (Scotland) Act 2011, which brought a fairer way to calculate damages after the death of a partner.
- The Rights to Relatives to Damages (Mesothelioma) (Scotland) 2007, which ended the injustice of asbestos victims foregoing compensation while alive so that their families could claim for damages after their death.
- The Damages (Scotland) (Asbestos-related conditions) Act 2009 – for the rights of Pleural Plaque and asymptomatic asbestosis victims in which he was a prominent figure and campaigner.
- The Social Security (Recovery of Benefits) Act 1997, which created a fairer compensation system where the wrongful party takes full responsibility for their actions and the victim receives fair compensation and is not penalised for receiving the state benefits to which they are entitled.
- The Damages (Scotland) Act 1993, which modernised, made fairer and clearer the criteria a Court should take into account and the basis upon which the Court should make an award of compensation to the relative of someone who dies through an accident, injury or disease.
- The Penrose Public Inquiry into the transmission of Hepatitis C and HIV through infected NHS blood and blood products – Maguire represented the Haemophilia Society and the victims infected with Hepatitis C in their campaign for a Public Inquiry.

=== Key cases ===
- Frank Maguire Key Cases - Thompsons Solicitors and Solicitor Advocates, September 2011
- Working people need a voice - Daily Record, Business 7 28 April 2011
- Asbestos-related illnesses: Victims win right to claim damages after landmark ruling - STV Scotland 13 April 2011
- Asbestos sufferers can continue compensation claims - BBC News 13 April 2011
- Pleural Plaques Campaigners and Victims Welcome Judgment - 12 April 2011
- Thompsons broadens its focus to hit the bullseye - Scotsman 2 April 2011
- Thompsons’ Partner Wins Solicitor of the Year Title - The Law Firm Awards 16 September 2010
- Frank Maguire on the Thomson Review - The Firm Magazine May 2010
- Judges' Faculty role under fire - The Firm Magazine May 2010
- The Jury of The Scottish Parliament is still out on reforming legal services - April 2010
- Opposing View - Holyrood Magazine March 2010
- New ‘Tesco law’ open to abuse by gangsters - The Herald 29 March 2010
- Campaigners Win Victory for Pleural Plaque Sufferers - March 2009
- Silent debate decides the hidden price of justice - The Firm Magazine November 2009
- Why this review is a threat to our civil court system - The Scotsman 7 April 2008
- Thompsons response paper to consultation paper on the civil courts review
- "Relatives' Claims on Death" - SLT 2 March 2007
- "Is it right that QCs worry what judges think about them?" - The Scotsman 13 February 2007
- "NHS Recovery of Charges" - SLT 19 January 2007

== Personal life ==
Maguire was married to Fiona Macdonald from 1987 until his death. They had four children: Calum, Matthew, Luke and John. Maguire always had a keen interest in sport. He was a dedicated distance runner, played football for Spartans FC, became Scottish Windsurfing Champion and was a Master Yachtsman. Maguire was an avid reader with a keen interest in ancient history and astronomy. He particularly enjoyed reading, and writing, poetry. He also played the harmonica.

== Obituaries ==
- Thompsons Solicitors, 17 September 2011
- The Firm Magazine, 18 September 2011
- The Herald, 21 September 2011
- The Journal Online, 17 October 2011
