= Libby McArthur =

Scottish actress

Libby McArthur (born in Castlemilk, Glasgow) is a Scottish actress known for her portrayal of Gina Hamilton in soap opera River City, a character she played from the show's inception in September 2002 until November 2013. Other television appearances include Taggart, Take The High Road, Rab C. Nesbitt and Looking After Jo Jo.

In the early 1980s she was a founder member and vocalist of pop group Sophisticated Boom Boom who had a number of John Peel sessions.

McArthur played the part of Dolly in the 30th anniversary touring production of Tony Roper's The Steamie in the Autumn of 2017.

In 2024, she appeared in the documentary Since Yesterday: The Untold Story of Scotland's Girl Bands by Blair Young and Carla Easton, which premiered at the Edinburgh International Film Festival on August 21 of that year.
