= Amy Duncan (singer) =

Scottish singer-songwriter

- Education: Royal Northern College of Music; Royal Scottish Academy of Music and Drama
- Occupation: Singer – songwriter
- Years active: 2006–present
- Website: amyduncan.co.uk

Amy Duncan is a Scottish singer-songwriter and multi-instrumentalist. She has recorded nine albums: Pilgrimage (2006), Story of a Girl (2007), Potential-Space (2010), Cycles of Life (2013) Undercurrents (2016), Antidote (2017), The Hidden World (2020), Cocoon (2021) and Wake (2024)

== Musical career ==
Duncan is a classically trained double bass player, studying at both the RNCM in Manchester and the RSAMD in Glasgow. After completing her studies, Duncan played double bass in experimental band Swelling Meg, who achieved a following in Edinburgh and Glasgow's underground music scene but disbanded in 2000.

Becoming a mother in 2000 saw Duncan channel her new perspective on life into song writing. Her debut album, 'Pilgrimage', was released in 2006 on US record label Plain Recordings, who discovered Duncan's music via social networking site Myspace. Between 2007 and 2010, Amy independently released a further two albums: Story of a Girl (2007) and Potential-Space (2010). Potential-Space was a collaboration with lyricist David Paton and the song Natural had a sync placement on Netflix ‘Charmed’. Her track 'My Dad' from the album 'Story of A Girl' was one of the winners of Burnsong 2007.

=== Linn records ===
In December 2012, Linn Records announced that they had signed Duncan. managing director of Linn Products Ltd, Gilad Tiefenbrun, said of the signing:

"We're excited to have Amy Duncan on Linn Records because she is everything we look for in new talent: original songwriting and heart-felt, pitch-perfect delivery combined in a powerful, musical experience."

Duncan stated:"Up until now my music has been entirely self-produced, and although I have loved that process there has always been a frustration that it doesn't sound as clear and as alive as it could. It feels very right to now be releasing the album with Linn Records, whose ethos of high quality sound is very close to my own heart and I'm very excited indeed that people will be able to listen to the recording in studio master quality."

=== Cycles of Life ===
Cycles of Life (2013), Duncan's fourth album, was released on 15 April 2013. This album was produced by Calum Malcolm with funding from Creative Scotland.

Her first single from the album, 'Navigating', was released in February 2013.

=== Undercurrents ===
Undercurrents (2016) was released on Duncan's own label Filly Records

=== Antidote ===
Antidote (2017) was self produced in Edinburgh, and reminiscent of Amy's earlier approach to recording in ‘Pilgrimage’ (2006) and ‘Story of a Girl’ (2007). It was mixed and mastered by Calum Malcolm. Amy states "I had a lot of fun walking around Edinburgh making field recordings from all over the city. You can hear these sounds weaving in and out of the songs"

=== The Hidden World ===
The Hidden World (2020) was engineered, mixed and mastered by Cameron Malcolm (son of Calum Malcolm) and features Guy Nicolson on percussion and tablas. Tracy Foster created 3 animations for Medusa, Labyrinth and The Hidden World in response to Amy's abstract photographs which had partly influenced the songwriting.

=== Cocoon ===
Cocoon (2021) was engineered, mixed and mastered by Cameron Malcolm (son of Calum Malcolm) and features Guy Nicolson on percussion and tablas. The album emerged from the lockdown and was funded through Creative Scotland Crowdmatch.

=== Wake ===
Wake (2024) is a collaboration with lyricist David Paton. It was produced in Glasgow with Mark Freegard in 2003 in the aftermath of the 1994 suicide of David's twin-brother Iain. It was both Amy's first recorded album as a solo-artist and is her ninth release.

The record was pressed on pink vinyl and released through the label Last Night From Glasgow

== Discography ==
=== Albums ===
- Pilgrimage (2006)
- Story of a Girl (2007)
- Potential-Space (2010)
- Cycles of Life (2013)
- Undercurrents (2016)
- Antidote (2017)
- The Hidden World (2020)
- Cocoon (2021)
- Wake (2024)

 Greetings from Gartnavel [2026]

=== Singles ===
- Navigating (2013)
