= Water of Milk =

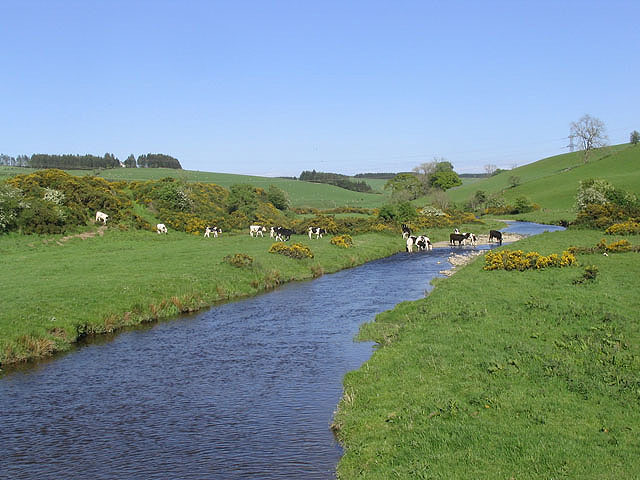

Physical characteristics
- Source: Southern Uplands
  - coordinates: 55°12′00″N 3°09′42″W
- Mouth: River Annan
  - coordinates: 55°02′46″N 3°20′01″W
- Length: 18 mi (29 km)

The Water of Milk is a minor river in Dumfriesshire, Scotland. It rises on the edge of Castle O'er Forest in the Southern Uplands and flows south and west into Annandale, falling into the Annan about three miles west of Ecclefechan. Its main tributary is the Corrie Water.
