= Last Night from Glasgow =

Scottish independent record label

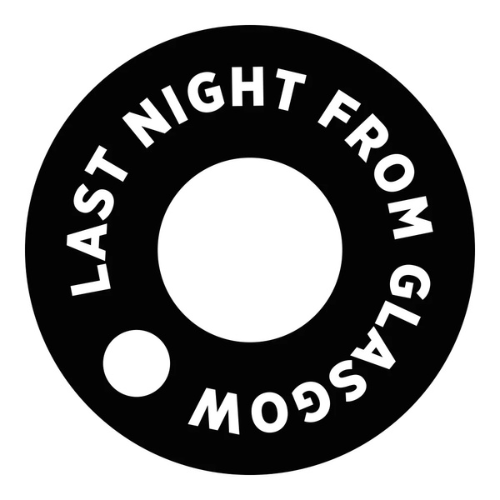
- LNFG logo
- Founded: 2016; 9 years ago
- Genre: various
- Country of origin: Scotland
- Location: Glasgow
- Official website: lastnightfromglasgow.com

Last Night from Glasgow (often abbreviated to LNFG) is an independent record label based in Glasgow, Scotland. It was established in 2016 and relies on a crowdfunding business model to operate.

== History ==
In January 2016, Ian Smith contacted five friends to establish a small record label. They agreed to found the business operated on a patronage model, with donations of a £50 from 60 of their friends and associates. The label's name is taken from the line "When I called you last night from Glasgow" in ABBA's "Super Trouper". The label's inaugural event took place on 2 June 2016 at The Old Hairdresser's venue in Glasgow, with 100 members and a roster of three artists. According to Smith, in the 2017 membership year the label operated with "200 or so" members.

In February 2018, it was announced that Last Night from Glasgow had been awarded Creative Scotland funding "...to produce the recording, production, manufacture, distribution and promotion of six vinyl albums and supporting digital releases for six currently unsigned Scottish artists". Further funding was obtained in February 2019 to "record, mix, master, produce, manufacture, promote and distribute seven albums and supporting digital releases.

In March 2020, the label announced they would be releasing 'The Isolation Sessions', an album of LNFG artists covering each other's songs with the proceeds going to venues that had to close due to COVID-19 lockdown laws. As of August 2020 over £3,000 had been donated to events and venues and over £3,500 of stock given to independent record stores. As part of the project, photographer Brian Sweeney took black and white photographs of LNFG members and artists. The format of the photos was inspired by historical pictures of Glasgow women hanging out of their windows.

In October 2020, LNFG organised a concert in an open-sided gazebo, to meet with local Covid-19 regulations, that The Herald described as 'Scotland's first concert in six months'.

== Operations ==
The label was founded with the intention of assisting unsigned artists with the physical release and promotion of their music. It operates as a private limited company. Artists retain the intellectual rights to their music, and all profits are reinvested into the label's operation. Operating capital is primarily raised by the sale of annual memberships and in return for their patronage, members receive a 12" vinyl copy of each of that year's releases, digital releases and guest list entry to all album launch events.

== Artists ==
The following artists have released music on the Last Night from Glasgow label:

- A Girl Called Eddy
- Amy Duncan
- Andre Salvador
- Andy White
- Annie Booth
- Armory Show
- Be Charlotte
- Billy Reeves
- Bis
- Blue Aeroplanes
- BMX Bandits
- Bone Idle Bros
- Brenda
- Broken Chanter
- Brontës
- Carla J. Easton
- Casual Sex
- Charlotte Hatherley
- Chiara Berardelli
- China Crisis
- Chris Reeve
- Close Lobsters
- Cloth
- Constant Follower
- Cosmic Rough Riders
- Countess of Fife
- Davey Woodward
- David Luximon
- Deer Leader
- Department S
- Dignity Row
- Dogs
- Domiciles
- Dr Robert & Matt Deighton
- Emme Woods
- Eugene Kelly
- F O Machete
- Fenella
- Foundlings
- Gareth Sager
- Gates of Light
- Gerry Marsden
- Goodbye Mr Mackenzie
- Hipsway
- Ian Donaldson
- In the Forest
- It's Immaterial
- Jen Butterworth
- Jerry Burns
- Joe Kane / Radiophonic Tuckshop
- Kilgour
- Kohla
- L-space
- Lemon Drink
- Loudmammoth
- Louise Connell
- Love & Money
- Lung Leg
- Marco Rossi
- Mark W. Georgsson
- Medicine Men
- Michael M
- Milltown Brothers
- Montjuïc
- Mt. Doubt
- Mull Historical Society
- Pearl Charles
- Peter Capaldi
- Popup
- Port Sulphur
- QUAD90
- Scorpio Leisure
- Secret Coast Songwriters
- SheBeat
- Sister John
- Slimecity
- Sophisticated Boom Boom
- St Dukes
- Starless
- Starry Skies
- Stephen Hero
- Stephen Solo
- Steve Lane
- Steven McDonald
- Sun Rose
- Superhuman
- The 1990s
- The Anchoress
- The Bathers
- The Blow Monkeys
- The Bluebells
- The Brilliant Corners
- The Cathode Ray
- The Cowboy Mouth
- The Eves
- The Filthy Tongues
- The Girl Who Cried Wolf
- The Golden Tree
- The Gracious Losers
- The Hedrons
- The Instant Garden
- The Jasmine Minks
- The Joshua Hotel
- The Martial Arts
- The Morning Early
- The Muldoons
- The New Leaves
- The Poems
- The Secret Goldfish
- The Skids
- The Soup Dragons
- The Supernaturals
- The Tenementals
- The Twistettes
- TheAudience
- Tom Dalzell
- Tom Donnelly
- Trashcan Sinatras
- We Are The Physics
- Win
- Wojtek The Bear
- Xan Tyler
- Zoë Bestel

== Sub-labels ==
=== Komponist ===
In July 2019 it was announced that LNFG would be launching a new label 'Komponist', "focused on the compositional artists as opposed to songwriters. Concentrating on all forms of instrumental music, be it Jazz, NeoClassical, Electronica or Heavy Drone."

=== Hive ===
In 2019 a new label called Hive was announced that would allow artists to use LNFG's promotional services while still self-releasing an album.

=== Past Night From Glasgow ===
In 2020 it was announced that a new label would be set up, called 'Past Night From Glasgow'. The purpose of the label is to re-issue older albums not currently available. The first album announced was Sisters by The Bluebells.

=== The LNFG Cartel ===
The LNFG Cartel is a sub-label of self-releasing artists & labels, who are not part of the main LNFG label. The Cartel provides logistical support for independent artists including manufacture, promotion, chart reporting, distribution or simply selling their CD on the LNFG website - whatever level of support needed, they can help.

== Releases ==
Excluding digital-only singles

Year	Type	Title	Artist	Format(s)	Catalogue No.	Release date	Notes
2016	Single	The Ballad of the Nearly Man	Mark W. Georgsson	7" vinyl	LNFG1		
2016	LP	Pii	Stephen Solo	USB credit card	LNFGUSB1		
2016	Single	I Don't Drink to Forget	Emme Woods	7" vinyl	LNFG2		
2016	LP	Say It All with a Kiss	TeenCanteen	12" vinyl, digital	LNFG3 / LNFGUSB2		
2016	EP	DebutHooHoo	BooHooHoo	USB wristband	LNFGUSB3		
2016	Single	Machines That Breathe	Be Charlotte	Digital, 7" vinyl	LNFG4		Limited edition 7" pink vinyl
2017	LP	Faces and Places	Mark W. Georgsson	12" vinyl, digital	LNFG 5		
2017	EP	Sirens	TeenCanteen	10″ vinyl, digital	LNFG6		Translucent splatter vinyl
2017	LP	Into the Light	Medicine Men	12" vinyl, digital	LNFG7		
2017	EP	Running Commentary EP	Radiophonic Tuckshop	CD, digital	LNFGd9		
2017	LP	Returned from Sea	Sister John	12" vinyl, digital	LNFG8		
2017	LP	Pii2	Stephen Solo	USB cassette	LNFGusb4		
2017	LP	An Unforgiving Light	Annie Booth	12" vinyl, digital	LNFG9 / LNFSF01		Co-release with Scottish Fiction
2017	LP	The Essential Luxury	Sun Rose	12" vinyl, digital	LNFG10		
2017	LP	The Winter Garden Playtest	Radiophonic Tuckshop	CD, digital	LNFGd14		
2017	Single	Golden Packets	Medicine Men	Cassette,digital	LNFGd16		
2018	EP	Money Can Be Exchanged for Goods and Services	L-space	CD, digital	LNFGd20		
2018	LP	The ABC of LNFG	Various Artists	CD, digital	LNFGd21		
2018	LP	Transience	Zoë Bestel	12" vinyl, CD, digital	LNFG11		
2018	Single	Wanting What I Can't Have	Carla J. Easton	CD, digital, 7” picture disk	LNFOG01		Co-release with Olive Grove Records
2018	LP	The Last of the Gracious Losers	The Gracious Losers	12" vinyl, digital	LNFG12		
2018	LP	Kipple Arcadia	L-space	12" vinyl, digital	LNFG13		
2018	LP	Joe Kane/Radiophonic Tuckshop	Joe Kane/Radiophonic Tuckshop	12" vinyl, digital	LNFG14		
2018	Single	Blue Flowers	L-space	7″ vinyl, digital	LNFG15		
2018	Single	Only You	Domiciles	Square 7″ vinyl, digital	LNFG16		
2018	Single	Holder	Cloth	Square 7″ vinyl, digital	LNFG17		
2018	EP	Three Bands	Cloth / Domiciles / L-space	CD, set of three 7" vinyl	LNFGd30		Special limited release to coincide with "Three Bands" tour
2019	LP	Sister John	Sister John	12" vinyl, digital	LNFG18	25/01/19	12" black vinyl, 12" transparent milk white vinyl
2019	LP	Slight Disconnects	Bis	12" vinyl CD, digital	LNFG19	15/02/19	Black, mandarin orange and yellow vinyl
2019	EP	Foundlings	Foundlings	CD, digital, lathe cut vinyl.	LNFG21	01/03/19	
2019	Single	Airport	Sister John	Digital, extremely rare heart shaped vinyl	LNFGd34	14/02/19	
2019	LP	A Gift from Midnight	Fenella	12" vinyl, digital	LNFG22	29/03/19	Black and red vinyl. Co-release with Little Tiger (Riverside Music College).
2019	EP	Spectral	Annie Booth	12" vinyl, CD, digital	LNFSF6 / LNFG23	10/05/19	Black and purple vinyl Co-release with Scottish Fiction.
2019	Single	For a Reason	Domiciles	Digital, lathe cut vinyl	LNFG24	26/04/19	
2019	Single	Back on Board	Medicine Men	Digital, lathe cut vinyl	LNFGd35	05/04/19	
2019	Single	Wholesale	Broken Chanter	Digital, lathe cut vinyl	LNFOG02	24/05/19	
2019	Single	Nothing Else	Sister John	Digital, lathe cut vinyl	LNFG26	14/06/19	AA side with LNFGd31.
2019	LP	Music for Megastructures	L-space	Digital.	LNFGd36	19/04/19	
2019	Single	Let Go	Loudmammoth	Digital, lathe cut vinyl	LNFG27	28/06/19	
2019	EP	I Used To Be The Martial Arts	The Martial Arts	Vinyl, CD and digital	LNFG28	05/07/19	
2019	Album	Pii3	Stephen Solo	Digital	LNFGd41	19/07/19	
2019	Album	This is Not A Zen Garden	Domiciles	12" vinyl, CD, digital	LNFG29	16/08/19	Black and white vinyl editions
2019	Album	Broken Chanter	Broken Chanter	12" vinyl, CD, digital	LNFG30 / LNFOG03	06/09/19	Black, milk white and duck egg blue vinyl editions. Co-release with Olive Grove Records.
2019	Album	Beast Rotations	Site of Future Rome	CD and digital	LNFGK01	04/10/19	Komponist
2019	Album	Cloth	Cloth	Vinyl, CD and digital	LNFG31	15/11/19	
2020	Album	Music For Megastructures	L-space	CD and digital	LNFGK03	31/01/20	Expanded Komponist release
2020	Single	Feed the Engines	L-space	Vinyl, CD and digital		07/02/20	
2020	Album	Post Neo Anti	Close Lobsters	Vinyl, CD and digital	LNFG33	28/02/20	
2020	EP	Better Run	Lemon Drink	CD and digital		14/03/20	
2020	Album	Artificial Mass	Yasuyuki Uesugi	CD and digital	LNFK04		Komponist
2020	Album	Vulture Party	Vulture Party	Vinyl, CD and digital		03/04/20	Hive
2020	Album	Earthbound	Starless	Vinyl, CD and digital	LNFG35	15/05/20	
2020	Album	A Different Port	Medicine Men	Vinyl, CD and digital	LNFG34	29/05/20	
2020	Album	Made For Each Other	The Muldoons	Vinyl & digital	LNFGH05	03/07/20	Hive
2020	Album	Now That's What I Call Disappointment	Michael M.	Vinyl & digital	LNFGH06	03/07/20	Hive
2020	Album	Comes A Time	Mark W Georgsson	Vinyl & digital	LNFG36	14/08/20	
2020	Album	Andre Salvador and the Von Kings	Andre Salvador and the Von Kings	Vinyl & digital	LNFGH07	28/08/20	Hive
2020	Single	On The Run / The Storm	In the Forest / Nicol & Elliott	Vinyl & digital		03/09/2020	
2020	Album	Isolation Sessions	Various Artists	Vinyl, CD & digital	LNFG37	August 2020	Double album
2020	Album	Doubtlands	Mt. Doubt	Vinyl & digital	LNFG38	18/09/20	
2020	Album	Edit	Joe McAlinden	Vinyl, CD and digital	LNFGK07	25/09/20	Komponist
2020	Album	Clean Living	Slow Weather	Vinyl & digital	LNFG39	November 2020	
2020	Single	IDST	Slime City	CD & Digital		20/11/20	
2020	Album	While I Sit and Watch This Tree	Lizabett Russo	Vinyl & digital	LNFGH09	27/11/20	Hive
2020	Album	Germinal	Tom Donnelly	CD and digital	LNFGK08	04/12/20	Komponist
2021	Album	Music For Animations	Bis	Vinyl, CD and digital	LNFG40	26/01/21	
2021	Album	Sisters	The Bluebells	Vinyl & digital	PNFG01	12/03/21	Past Night From Glasgow
2021	Album	Six Road Ends	Gracious Losers	Vinyl & digital	LNFG43	26/03/21	
2021	Album	Another Life	Hadda Be	Vinyl, CD and digital	LNFG44	30/04/21	
2021	Album	Star Wars	BMX Bandits	Vinyl & digital	PNFG02	30/04/21	Past Night From Glasgow - 30th Anniversary release
2021	Album	I Am By Day	Sister John	Vinyl, CD and digital	LNFG45	28/05/21	
2021	Album	Citalodisco	Ace City Racers	Vinyl & digital	LNFGH14	25/06/21	Hive
