= Olive Grove Records =

Independent record label in Glasgow, Scotland

- Founded: 2010
- Country of origin: Scotland
- Location: Glasgow
- Official website: olivegroverecords.com

Olive Grove Records is an independent record label based in Glasgow, Scotland. The company was established in 2010 by Halina Rifai and Lloyd Meredith, two Glasgow-based music bloggers.

== History ==
Halina Rifai and Lloyd Meredith of the Podcart and Peenko music blogs co-founded the label in 2010. The label's name comes from the song "An Olive Grove Facing The Sea" by the band Snow Patrol. Their debut release was "Battleships & Kettle Chips" by Randolph's Leap in November 2010.

Currently, the label is operated on a part-time basis under the direction of Lloyd Meredith.

== The Archipelago EPs ==
In July 2018, it was announced the label had been awarded a Creative Scotland Open Project Funding grant to support the release of a series of EPs by up-and-coming Scottish-based artists with little or no studio experience. Launched in 2019, the 6-part series featured releases from Chrissy Barnacle, Pocket Knife, Moonsoup, Circle Meets Dot, Lux Canyon, and Jared Celosse.

== Artists ==
The following artists have released music on the Olive Grove label:

- Randolph's Leap (band)
- Esperi
- The Son(s)
- Pensioner
- The Moth & The Mirror
- State Broadcasters
- Jo Mango
- Woodenbox
- Call To Mind
- Skinny Dipper
- Henry & Fleetwood
- Ette
- The Royal Male
- Campfires in Winter
- Carla J. Easton
- Broken Chanter
- Pocket Knife
- Jared Celosse
- Raveloe
- Circle Meets Dot
- Chrissy Barnacle
- Moonsoup

== Releases ==
Year	Title	Artist	Catalogue number	Release date
2010	Battleships & Kettle Chips	Randolph's Leap	OGR001	15/11/10
2010	Made For Life/Snowman	Esperi	OGR002	13/12/10
2011	The Son(s)	The Son(s)	OGR003	07/03/11
2011	Yearlings	Pensioner	OGR004	02/05/11
2011	Counting Sheep / Deep Blue Sea	Randolph's Leap	OGR005	16/05/11
2011	The EP	Esperi	OGR006	04/08/11
2011	Germany	The Moth & The Mirror	OGR007	05/09/11
2011	Honestly, This World	The Moth & The Mirror	OGR008	10/10/11
2012	Leviathan	The Son(s)	OGR009	07/05/12
2012	Ghosts We Must Carry	State Broadcasters	OGR0010	17/09/12
2012	Murmuration	Jo Mango	OGR0011	05/11/12
2012	Christmas EP	Jo Mango, The Son(s), Randolph's Leap and the State Broadcasters	OGR0012	07/12/12
2013	End Game	Woodenbox	OGR0013	27/05/13
2013	Real Anymore	Randolph's Leap	OGR0014	06/09/13
2013	When We Lived in the Crook of a Tree	Jo Mango	OGR0015	02/12/13
2014	The Winter Is White	Call To Mind	OGR0016	14/04/14
2014	Masks	Skinny Dipper	OGR0017	08/09/14
2014	Transformuration	Jo Mango	OGR0018	13/10/14
2014	The Things I Love Are Not At Home	The Son(s)	OGR0019	27/10/14
2015	On The Forest Floor EP	Henry & Fleetwood	OGR0020	13/04/15
2015	Foreign Organ	Woodenbox	OGR0021	08/06/15
2015	Special Occasions	Ette	OGR0022	13/12/15
2016	Wrack Lines	Jo Mango & Friends	OGR0023	15/01/16
2016	Cowardly Deeds	Randolph's Leap	OGR0024	20/05/16
2016	Homemade Lemonade	Ette	OGR0025	22/07/16
2016	Plastic Throne	The Royal Male	OGR0027	05/08/16
2016	It Is Something To Have Been EP	Jo Mango, The State Broadcasters, The Son(s) and Call To Mind	OGR0028	25/11/16
2017	Ischaemia	Campfires in Winter	OGR0026	24/02/17
2017	A Different Past	State Broadcasters	OGR0029	24/03/17
2017	From Olive Us To Olive You	Various Artists	OGR0031	08/12/17
2018	Four Cold Walls	Jared Celosse	OGR0030	30/03/18
2018	Impossible Stuff	Carla J. Easton	OGR0032	05/10/18
2018	Fish Song / Custard Cream	Pocket Knife	OGR0033	01/12/18
