= Carla Easton =

Scottish singer-songwriter

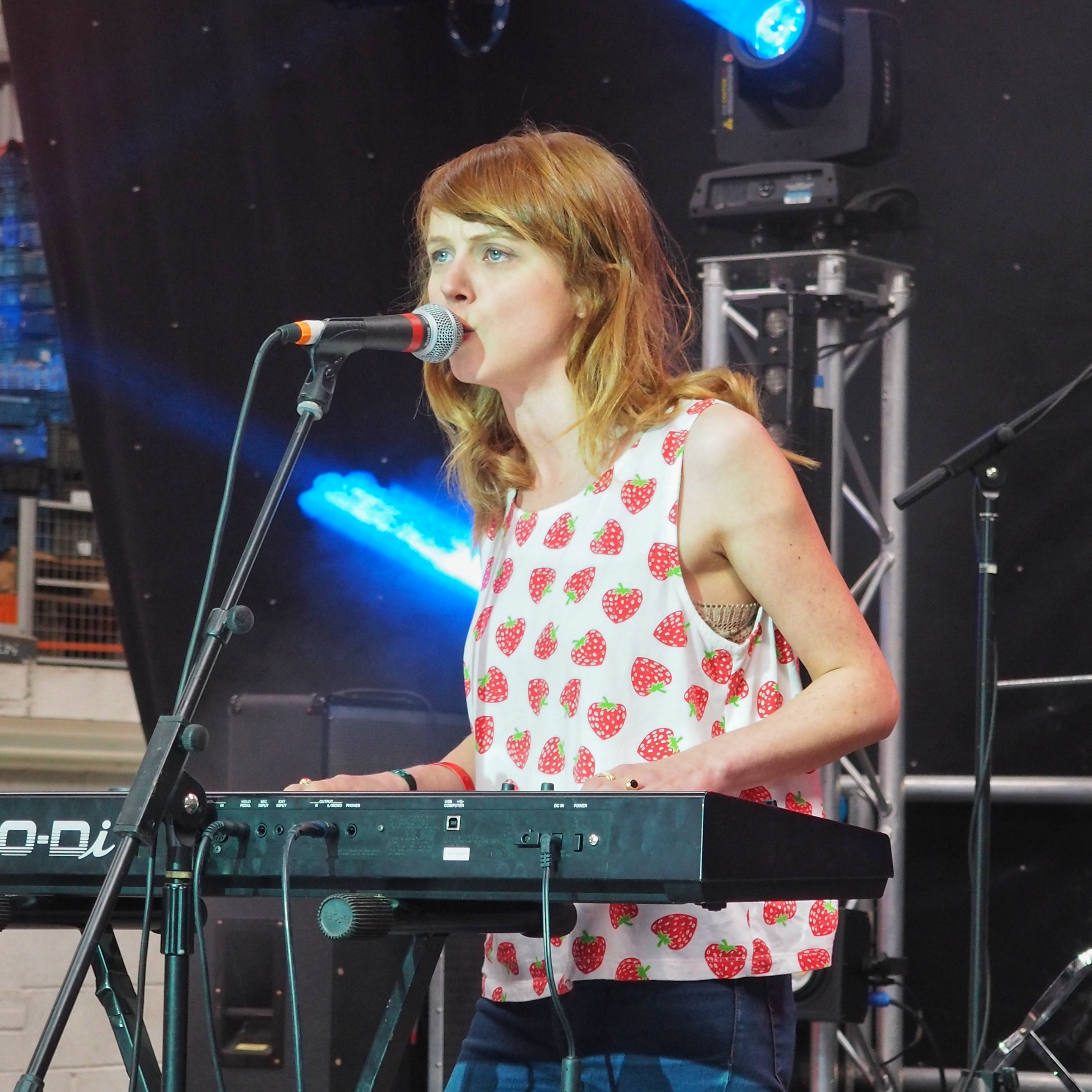
- Easton performing with TeenCanteen at Indietracks, 2017
- Born: Carla Jennifer Easton; 1985 (age 40–41)
- Education: Edinburgh College of Art; Glasgow School of Art
- Occupations: Singer; songwriter; filmmaker
- Years active: 2006–present
- Musical career
- Origin: Carluke, Lanarkshire, Scotland
- Genres: Indie pop; alternative rock
- Instruments: Vocals; piano; keyboard
- Labels: Last Night From Glasgow; Olive Grove Records; Neu!Reekie!
- Member of: Poster Paints; TeenCanteen; The Vaselines
- Formerly of: Futuristic Retro Champions
- Website: carlajennifereaston.com

Carla Jennifer Easton (born 1985) is a Scottish singer-songwriter and filmmaker. Easton has been a member of the bands Futuristic Retro Champions and TeenCanteen and is currently keyboard player for The Vaselines. She has also pursued a solo career, initially under the name Ette and now under the name Carla J. Easton. Her 2018 album Impossible Stuff was shortlisted for the Scottish Album of the Year Award in 2019.

== Biography ==
Easton grew up in Carluke, a commuter town in South Lanarkshire, Scotland. Her musical tastes were influenced by her older brother, who was 10 years older than her and interested in a wide variety of genres. In 2007, Easton graduated from the Edinburgh College of Art with a BA (Hons) Sculpture. In 2011, she graduated with a Masters of Fine Art from Glasgow School of Art.

=== Futuristic Retro Champions ===
In 2006, Easton formed the band Futuristic Retro Champions with friends from the Edinburgh School of Art, with a sound combining 'wistful pop' with 'processed-beats'. The band split up in 2010, having released two EPs.

=== TeenCanteen ===
Easton formed TeenCanteen in 2012, on vocals and playing keyboard, with Sita Pieraccini on bass, Chloe Philip on guitar and Debs Smith on drums. In 2016, their debut album Say It All with a Kiss, which made the Longlist for the Scottish Album of the Year Award in 2017, was released by Last Night From Glasgow. In 2017, they released an EP Sirens, then announced that TeenCanteen were taking a break.

=== Solo career ===
In 2016, Easton released her solo album Homemade Lemonade through Olive Grove Records under the name Ette. The album was listed as number 4 on the Bandcamp best albums of 2016, where it was described as a 'big, loud, glorious confection'.

In 2017, Easton was invited to the first singer-songwriter residency at the Banff Centre for Arts and Creativity. At the residency she met Howard Bilerman who later invited her to record an album in his Montreal studio. This was released as Impossible Stuff in 2018 under the name Carla J. Easton. Impossible Stuff was shortlisted for the Scottish Album of the Year Award in 2019.

Her next solo album Weirdo was released on Olive Grove Records on 28 August 2020, with the title track featuring Stina Tweeddale of Honeyblood. The album title was chosen after Easton was told she was weird and she decided that being a weirdo should not be seen negatively. Most of the songs were written while Easton was homeless, and dealing with issues relating to low self-esteem and anxiety. Many of the tracks were co-wrtitten with Scott Paterson of Sons and Daughters. The album was well received, with it being named by Pitchfork as one of the 'Great Records You May Have Missed' of Summer 2020, saying that the album had 'the scrappy glamour of a homemade theatrical production'. Other reviews said that it was 'more robust' than previous records, with praise directed to the quality of the production work and the overall sound.

=== Poster Paints ===
In 2021, Easton formed Poster Paints with Simon Liddell, the former guitarist of Frightened Rabbit. The band was created after Easton and Liddell started sharing music ideas by email during Scotland's COVID-19 lockdown.

=== Other works ===
Easton co-wrote and sang the lead vocals on “Best Friend,” a track on Belle & Sebastian's How to Solve Our Human Problems EP (Part 3), released in 2018.

In 2019, Easton composed and performed the music for the National Theatre of Scotland's production of Them! in the Tramway, Glasgow. In the same year, she joined The Vaselines as their synth player for Belle and Sebastian's Boaty Weekender.

In 2024, Easton co-directed the documentary film Since Yesterday, also narrating and contributing research to the film.

== Discography ==
=== Futuristic Retro Champions ===
- FRC EP (2010)
- LaChunky EP (2010)
- May The Forth/Settle Down (2010)

=== TeenCanteen ===
- Honey (2013) – Neu!Reekie! records
- You're Still Mine/ Vagabond (2014) – Neu!Reekie! records
- Say It All with a Kiss (2016) – Last Night From Glasgow
- Sirens (2017) – Last Night From Glasgow

=== Solo ===
- Homemade Lemonade (2016) – Olive Grove Records
- Impossible Stuff (2018) – Olive Grove Records
- Weirdo (2020) – Olive Grove Records
- Sugar Honey (2023) – Olive Grove Records
