= The McKinley Sisters =

Scottish pop duo

- Also known as: The McKinley Sisters (Germany)
- Origin: Little France, Edinburgh, Scotland
- Genres: British pop/rock
- Years active: 1962–1971
- Labels: Columbia, Parlophone, Fontana (Germany)
- Past members: Sheila McKinley; Jeanette McKinley

The McKinley Sisters were a Scottish pop duo comprising sisters Sheila (born 12 December 1941, Little France, Edinburgh, Scotland – 16 December 2012, Bournemouth, England) and Jeanette McKinley (1 September 1948, Little France, Edinburgh, Scotland). The sisters recorded pop singles such as "Sweet and Tender Romance", which they sang on the TV pop show Ready Steady Go!. They also performed on the same bill with such groups as The Beatles, The Rolling Stones and The Hollies.

== Subsequent music careers ==
Following the release of their fourth single in 1965, the sisters moved to Germany where they toured as The McKinley Sisters. Jeanette later became one-half of a vocal duo called Die Windows, scoring a #1 hit in 1972 with a German language cover of the Mouth & MacNeal song "How Do You Do". In 1973 Sheila joined the famous Les Humphries Singers, where she sang lead vocals on many tracks and toured extensively in Europe (1973-75 & 91-93). Both sisters also provided backing vocals for Paice Ashton Lord's 1977 album Malice in Wonderland. Sheila sang on Ringo Starr's Stop and Smell the Roses and Das erste Mal by Marius Müller-Westernhagen.

== Later life ==
Both women eventually returned to the UK, Sheila settling down in Bournemouth with her husband Howie Casey, (saxophonist for Paul McCartney and Wings and band leader of Howie Casey and the Seniors), where they still performed music on a regular basis. Jeanette meanwhile returned to Edinburgh, settling down and marrying a local man, going on to have 4 children.

On 16 December 2012, Sheila passed after battling cancer, aged 71.

In 2024, the McKinley sisters were featured prominently in the documentary film "Since Yesterday: The Untold Story of Scotland's Girl Bands", which features an interview with Jeanette recounting her music career with her sister. This went on to win "Best Scottish Film" in The List Festival Awards.

== Singles ==
- "Someone Cares for Me" (Columbia, 1964)
- "When He Comes Along" (Columbia, 1964)
- "Sweet and Tender Romance" (Parlophone, 1964)
- "Give Him My Love" (Columbia, 1965) written by Donovan
- "I Want You" (Fontana, Germany, 1967)
- "Wer nicht hören will muss fühlen" (Fontana, 1967)
- "Große Katastrophe" (Fontana, 1968)
