= Kathryn Hays =

American actress (1934–2022)

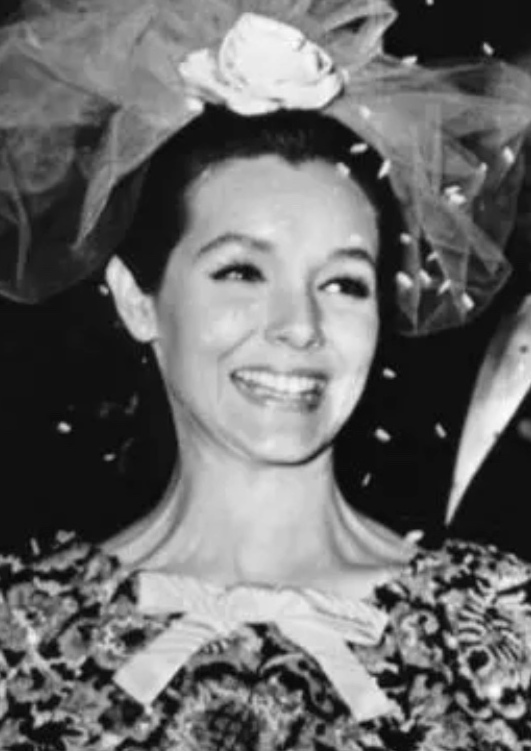
- Hays in 1966
- Born: Kay Piper; July 26, 1934; Princeton, Illinois, U.S.
- Died: March 25, 2022 (aged 87); Fairfield, Connecticut, U.S.
- Occupations: Actress; model
- Years active: 1962–2010
- Known for: Kim Sullivan Hughes on As the World Turns
- Spouses: Sidney Steinberg (m. 1957, divorced) Glenn Ford (m. 1966; div. 1969) Wolf Lieshke (m. 1984; div. 1986)
- Children: 1

Kathryn Hays (born Kay Piper; July 26, 1934 – March 25, 2022) was an American actress, best known for her role as Kim Hughes on the CBS soap opera As the World Turns from 1972 to 2010.

== Early life ==
Hays was born in Princeton, Illinois, the only child of Roger and Daisy (Hays) Piper. Her parents divorced shortly after her birth. Hays was raised by her mother, who was a bookkeeper and a banker, and her stepfather, salesman Arnold Gottlieb.

Hays grew up in Joliet. She graduated from Joliet Central High School in 1952. Hays took classes at Northwestern University and worked as a department store model and then she was in television commercials in Chicago. She moved to New York City to continue her modeling career and become one of the highest paid models. In 1962, she changed her name to Kathryn Hays (using her mother's maiden name as her last name).

== Career ==
=== Episodic TV, film, and Broadway ===
Early in her career, Hays made numerous appearances on episodic TV, and made a few later in her career. In 1968, she guest starred in Star Trek as the eponymous central character in the episode “The Empath”, playing a mute alien with healing powers. She also had appearances in The Man from U.N.C.L.E., The Road West, and the 1964 Mr. Novak episode "One Way to Say Goodbye". She guest starred in episodes of Hawaiian Eye, Surfside 6, Naked City, Route 66, The High Chaparral, Here Come the Brides, Marcus Welby, M.D., and Owen Marshall, Counselor at Law. Hays guest starred in Bonanza, The Alfred Hitchcock Hour, The Virginian, and Mr. Deeds Goes to Town. In a 2010 interview with the website We Love Soaps, Hays said of the early appearances: "It was a great time to begin a career. It was when the guest stars on the primetime shows were almost always women. The running star would be a man. The main storyline would be a very rich part to play." She was in episodes of Mannix and Night Gallery with Leonard Nimoy. In 1972, Hays guest starred on an episode of Cade's County.

Hays also appeared in the films Ladybug Ladybug (1963), Ride Beyond Vengeance (1966) and Counterpoint (1968). She was considered for the role of Neely O'Hara in Valley of the Dolls (1967), but the role ultimately went to Patty Duke. Hays was in the TV films This Savage Land, Breakout and Yuma as Julie Williams. In later years, her TV appearances included Law & Order, Law & Order: Special Victims Unit, and in 2010 on One Life to Live.

Prior to her role on As the World Turns, Hays played the role of nurse Leslie Jackson Bauer, RN on The Guiding Light for three months. In 1977, she, along with Michael Allison, Meg Bennett, David Hasselhoff, Don Stewart, and Tudi Wiggins, starred in a CBS TV special entitled After Hours: Getting to Know Us.

Hays appeared in Broadway productions several times, including a regional production of Dames at Sea with Bernadette Peters. She was in the productions of Ladybug, Ladybug, The Irregular Verb to Love, and Hot September. Hays was in summer stock productions of Show Boat, Richard Rogers' Two By Two, Follies, and A Little Night Music. In 1982, she was in the one-woman Broadway play Love Notes where she performed One Step, Broadway Baby from Follies, I Can Do That from A Chorus Line, and If I Loved You from Carousel.

=== As the World Turns ===
In 1972, Hays was cast as Kim Sullivan Hughes on CBS's As the World Turns. She was originally hired for six months. Hays remained with the show until its final episode on September 17, 2010. The character of Kim was a pivotal heroine on the show for over thirty years. Hays was prominently featured in the 50th anniversary episode of the show, which aired in April 2006.

In May 2020, she appeared in an As The World Turns reunion episode of The Locher Room, one of a series of YouTube episodes reuniting various soap actors, as well as being the subject of a The Locher Room tribute in 2022.

== Personal life and death ==
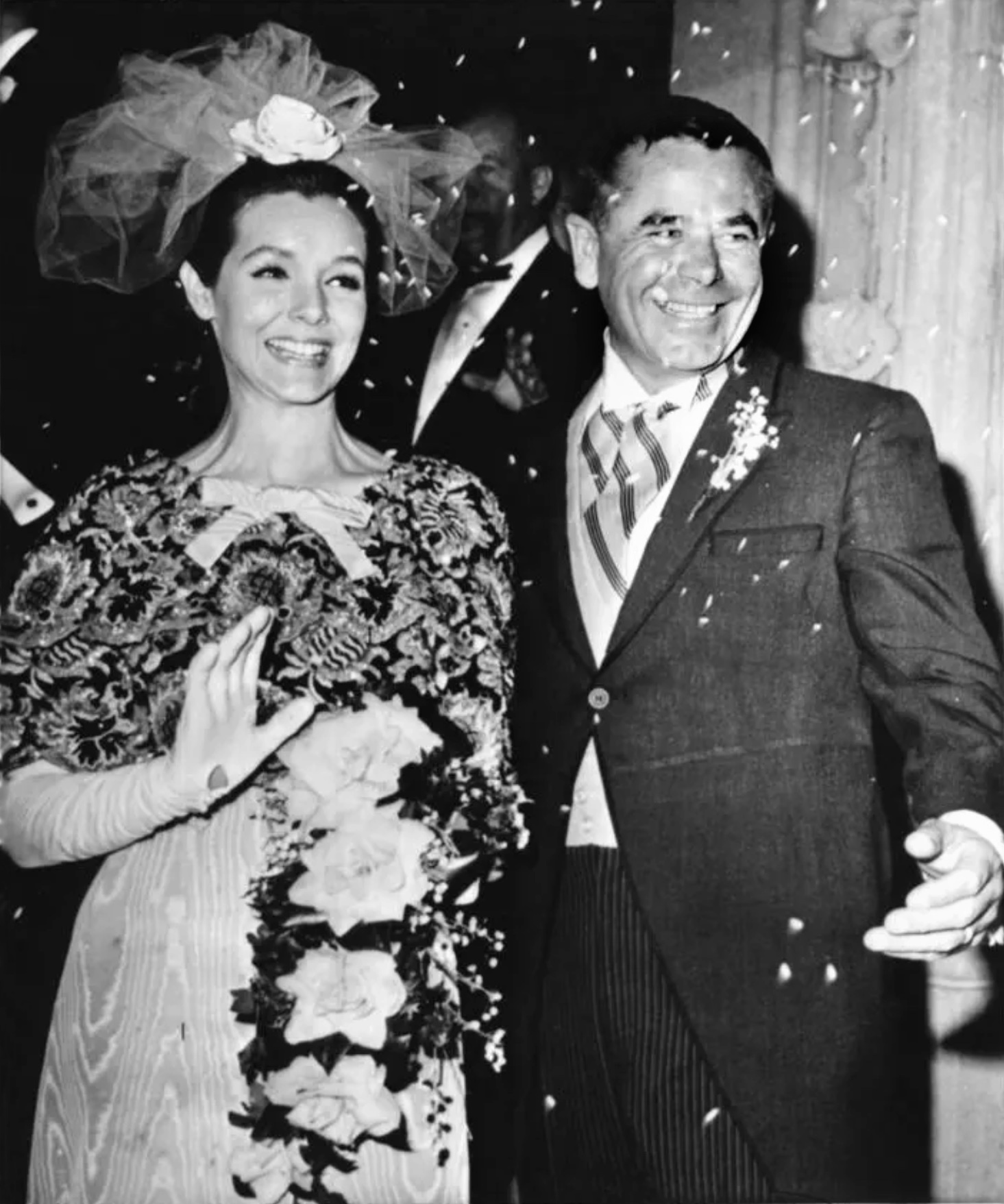
Glenn Ford and Kathryn Hays on their wedding day in 1966

Hays' first marriage was to salesman Sidney Steinberg in 1957, with whom she had a daughter. In 1964 she met actor Glenn Ford at a Hollywood dinner party. In 1966, she married Ford; the couple divorced in 1969. Her third husband was Wolfgang Lieschke, who was employed in the advertising industry. She also enjoyed music, church, and dogs.

Hays died on March 25, 2022, in Fairfield, Connecticut. She had been living in an assisted living facility at the time of her death. Her daughter participated in a November 2022 fan tribute on The Locher Room YouTube channel that honored Hays; in the interview, she said that Hays had had dementia in the years prior to her death.

Hays was honored at the 29th Screen Actors Guild Awards in a video montage where actor Don Cheadle opened the In Memoriam with: "We were their friends, colleagues, and their fans. Regardless of relationship, we knew and loved the actors that we loved and lost last year. We traveled with them on unforgettable journeys; they told us the best stories".

== Filmography ==
=== Film ===
Year	Title	Role	Director(s)	Notes
1963	Ladybug Ladybug	Betty Forbes	Frank Perry	Docudrama; Based on They Thought the War Was On by Lois Dickert
1966	Ride Beyond Vengeance	Jessie Larkin Trapp	Bernard McEveety	Western film Based on The Night of the Tiger by Al Dewlen.
1968	Counterpoint	Annabelle Rice	Ralph Nelson	War film Based on the novel The General by Alan Sillitoe

=== Television ===
Year	Title	Role	Notes
1962	Hawaiian Eye	Jean Morgan	Episode: "Total Eclipse"
1962	Surfside 6	Joy Allen	Episode: "Many a Slip"
1962	Naked City	Beth Rydecker	Episode: "The Rydecker Case"
1963	The United States Steel Hour	Rachel Trafford	Episode: "Moment of Rage"
1963	Wide Country	Lila Never	Episode: "The Girl from Nob Hill"
1963	Dr. Kildare	Gina Beemis	Episode: "An Island Like a Peacock"
1963	Route 66	Judith Kane	Episode: "Shadows of an Afternoon"
1963	The Lieutenant	Carol Wayden	Episode: "Cool of the Evening"
1963	The Eleventh Hour	Hallie Lambert	Episode: "What Did She Mean by Good Luck?"
1964	The Nurses	Sheila Warren	Episode: "Climb a Broken Ladder"
1964	Mr. Novak	Jenny Peterson	Episode: "One Way to Say Goodbye"
1964	Arrest and Trial	Joanne Collins	Episode: "He Ran for His Life"
1964	Bonanza	Prudence Jessup	Episode: "The Wild One"
1964	The Defenders	Katy Vronis	Episode: "King of the Hill"
1965	The Alfred Hitchcock Hour	Joyce Dailey	Episode: "One of the Family"
1965	The Virginian	Charity	Episode: "A Slight Case of Charity"
1965	The Man from U.N.C.L.E.	Mary Pilgrim	Episode: "The See-Paris-and-Die Affair"
1965	Branded	Christina Adams	Episode: "Very Few Heroes"
1965	Kraft Suspense Theatre	Terry Camion	Episode: "Kill Me on July 20th"
1966	Run for Your Life	Belle Frazer	Episode: "The Cruel Fountain"
1966	The Merv Griffin Show	Self	Episode: "Glenn Ford, Kathryn Hays, Irene Ryan, Barrie Chase, Georgie Kaye"
1966–67	The Road West	Elizabeth Reynolds	Main role
1967	The Hollywood Squares	Self	15 episodes Panelist
1967	39th Academy Awards	Self	Audience Member
1967	Vacation Playhouse	Betsy Fleming	Episode: "You're Only Young Twice"
1968	The High Chaparral	Frances O'Toole	Episode: "Tornado Frances"
1968	Mannix	Betsy Charnik	Episode: "The End of the Rainbow"
1968	Star Trek	Gem	Episode: "The Empath"
1969	Here Come the Brides	Dena	Episode: "A Kiss Just for So"
1969	This Savage Land	Elizabeth Reynolds	Made-for-TV movie directed by Vincent McEveety
1970	Breakout	Ann Baker	Made-for-TV movie directed by Richard Irving
1971	The Bold Ones: The New Doctors	Marcy	Episode: "An Absence of Loneliness"
1971	Yuma	Julie Williams	ABC Movie of the Week directed by Ted Post
1971	Marcus Welby, M.D.	Ellen	Episode: "In My Father's House"
1971	Owen Marshall: Counselor at Law	Lori Phillips	Episode: "Nothing Personal"
1971	Bearcats!	Milly Todd	Episode: "The Return of Estaban"
1971	The Guiding Light	Leslie Jackson Bauer, RN #2	Three month contract
1972	Cade's County	Helen Derman	Episode: "Ragged Edge"
1972	Night Gallery	June	Episode: "She'll Be Company for You"
1972–2010	As the World Turns	Kim Sullivan Hughes	Contract role held from August 31, 1972 to September 17, 2010
1973	Circle of Fear	Janet	Episode: "Legion of Demons"
1975	ABC's Wide World of Entertainment	Self	Episode: "A Salute to Daytime Dramas"
1977	After Hours: Getting to Know Us	Self	TV special
1989	American Playhouse	Harriet Rodker	Episode: "Ask Me Again"
1999	Law & Order	Gloria Blumberg	Episode: "Sundown"
2006	SoapTalk	Self	Episode: "5 April 2006"
2006	33rd Daytime Emmy Awards	Self	As the World Turns Tribute
2007	Law & Order: Special Victims Unit	Jane Willet	Episode: "Florida"
2010	One Life to Live	Kim Hughes	Episode: "Shiver Deep, Mountain High"
2023	29th Screen Actors Guild Awards	Self	In Memoriam

== Awards and nominations ==
Year	Award	Category	Title	Role	Result	Ref.
1998	Soap Opera Digest Award	Editor's Choice	As the World Turns	Kim Sullivan Hughes	Won	
