= The Loneliness of the Long-Distance Runner =

The Loneliness of the Long-Distance Runner may refer to:

- The Loneliness of the Long-Distance Runner (short story), a 1959 short story by Alan Sillitoe.
- The Loneliness of the Long Distance Runner (film), a 1962 film adaptation of the story
- The Loneliness of the Long-Distance Runner (short story collection), a 1959 collection by Sillitoe including the story
- "The Loneliness of the Long Distance Runner", an Iron Maiden song from their 1986 album Somewhere in Time

== See also ==
- "The Loneliness of the Long Distance Entrepreneur", a 1991 episode of the British series Minder
- "The Loneliness of the Long Distance Granny", a short story by Ben Aaronovitch
- "The Loneliness of the Long Distance Walker", a 1969 episode of the British series Dad's Army
