= Key to the Door =

1961 novel by Alan Sillitoe

- First edition
- Author: Alan Sillitoe
- Language: English
- Publisher: W. H. Allen
- Publication date: 1961
- Publication place: United Kingdom
- Media type: Print (hardback & paperback)
- Pages: 446 pp
- ISBN: 0333040619
- Preceded by: The General
- Followed by: The Ragman's Daughter and other stories

Key to the Door is a novel by English author Alan Sillitoe, first published in 1961.

== Synopsis ==
Key to the Door is the story of a young man growing up in the grim backstreets of Nottingham, England in the 1940s. He attempts to find a way of shaking off the stifling working class expectations that are thrust upon him from all sectors of society. After leaving school for a soulless job in a cardboard factory and at 18 marries a girl who he has been in a relationship with for 3 years, and who he has made pregnant. He is finally called up for National Service and sent to Malaya during the Emergency where he finds himself an unwilling combatant against Chinese communists, whom he thinks of more as comrades in the class struggle rather than as enemies. Based in part on the author's own experiences in Nottingham and in Malaya, the novel was unfavourably compared to the author’s previous stories of working class life in Nottingham, Saturday Night and Sunday Morning and The Loneliness of the Long-Distance Runner, but proved popular enough to be reprinted in 1978.

== Relation to other books ==
Key to the Door is the second part of the Seaton family trilogy, which commenced with Saturday Night and Sunday Morning (1958), although chronologically it is set before the earlier book.

Critical response to the novel was largely negative.

The third book is The Open Door (1989).

In 2001 Sillitoe revisited the Seaton family in his novel Birthday, but this time the focus was on Arthur Seaton's brother Brian, a successful writer of TV sitcoms.
