= Saturday Night and Sunday Morning =

1958 novel by Alan Sillitoe

- Cover of the first UK edition
- Author: Alan Sillitoe
- Cover artist: Mona Moore
- Language: English
- Publisher: W. H. Allen Ltd
- Publication date: 1958
- Publication place: United Kingdom
- Media type: Print (hardback and paperback)
- Pages: 213 pp
- OCLC: 1807352

Saturday Night and Sunday Morning is the first novel by British author Alan Sillitoe and won the Authors' Club Best First Novel Award.

It was adapted by Sillitoe into the 1960 film of the same name starring Albert Finney, directed by Karel Reisz, and in 1964 was adapted by David Brett as a play for the Nottingham Playhouse, with Ian McKellen playing one of his first leading roles.

Sillitoe later wrote three further parts to the Seatons' story, Key to the Door (1961), The Open Door (1989) and Birthday (2001).

== Plot ==
The novel Saturday Night and Sunday Morning is split into two unequal parts: the bulk of the book, Saturday Night, and the much smaller second part, Sunday Morning.

Saturday Night

Saturday Night begins in a working man's club in Nottingham. Arthur Seaton is 22 years old, and enjoying a night out with Brenda, the wife of a colleague at work. Challenged to a drinking contest, Arthur defeats "Loudmouth" before falling down the stairs drunk. Brenda takes him home with her and they spend the night together. Arthur enjoys breakfast with Brenda before her husband Jack gets home from a weekend at the races.

Arthur works at a lathe at a bicycle factory with his friend Jack. Arthur keeps his mind occupied during the mundane and repetitive work through a mental collage of imagined fantasies, and memories of the past. He earns a good wage of 14 pounds a week, and Robboe, his superior, fears he may get in trouble for letting Arthur earn so much. Soon Arthur hears the news that Jack has been switched to nights, which pleases Arthur as he can now spend more time with Jack's wife. At the same time, Arthur carries on with Brenda's sister Winnie.

During another night out at the pub, Arthur meets Doreen, a young unmarried girl with whom he begins a relatively innocent courtship — all the while keeping Brenda and Winnie a secret. However, although Jack is oblivious to his wife's infidelity, Winnie's husband Bill catches on — and Arthur's actions catch up with him when Bill and an accomplice jump Arthur one night, leaving him beaten and bed-ridden for days.

Sunday Morning

Sunday Morning follows the course of events after Arthur's assault. When Doreen comes to check up on him, Arthur finally comes clean about his affairs with Brenda and Winnie. Doreen stays in a relationship with Arthur despite his dishonesty; Brenda and Winnie disappear from the story. By the end of the novel, Arthur and Doreen have made plans to marry.

== Cultural references ==
- Miranda Grey in John Fowles's The Collector (1963) found the book and its protagonist Arthur Seaton "disgusting".
- English singer Morrissey was heavily influenced by the book and its 1960 film adaptation. The runout groove on the B-side of vinyl copies of The Smiths' 1986 album The Queen Is Dead feature the line "Them was rotten days" said by Aunt Ada (Hylda Baker) in the film. Also the line said by Doreen before Arthur takes her to the fair "I want to go where there's life and there's people" inspired the song "There Is a Light That Never Goes Out" on the same album ("I want to see people and I want to see life").
- The title of Arctic Monkeys' debut album Whatever People Say I Am, That's What I'm Not is a direct quote from the book, and many of its songs were inspired by the protagonist Arthur. The art design of the album was influenced by the realist images of British working-class neighbourhoods and night life in Saturday Night and Sunday Morning.
- During a 2011 BBC interview on Desert Island Discs, the comedian Frank Skinner stated that Saturday Night and Sunday Morning was the first book he read at the age of 21.
- In 2013, BBC Radio 4 presented a two-part dramatic adaptation (by Robert Rigby) of the novel.

== Critical reception ==
On 5 November 2019, BBC News included Saturday Night and Sunday Morning on its list of the 100 most influential novels.
