= Breakout (1970 film) =

1970 American television film

- Written by: Sy Gomberg
- Directed by: Richard Irving
- Starring: James Drury; Red Buttons; Kathryn Hays; Woody Strode
- Composer: Shorty Rogers
- Country of origin: United States
- Original language: English

Production
- Producer: Richard Irving
- Cinematography: Ray Flin
- Editor: Milton Shifman

Original release
- Network: NBC
- Release: May 31, 1971

Breakout is a 1970 American TV film which broadcast on NBC.

== Cast ==
- James Drury as Joe Baker
- Red Buttons as Pipes
- Kathryn Hays as Ann Baker
- Woody Strode as Skip Manion
- Sean Garrison as Frank McCready
- Victoria Paige Meyerink as Marian
- Bert Freed as Fletcher
- Mort Mills as Middleton
- William Mims as Banks
- Harold J. Stone as Phil Caprio
- Don Wilbanks as Mackey
- Kenneth Tobey as Ranger
- Ric Roman as Bianchi

== Screenings ==
In the US, the film was shown on NBC at 9:00 pm on 31 May 1971.

The film was shown in the UK on BBC One at 7:30 pm on Tuesday, February 22, 1972.
