= Elliot Barnes-Worrell =

British actor (born 1991)

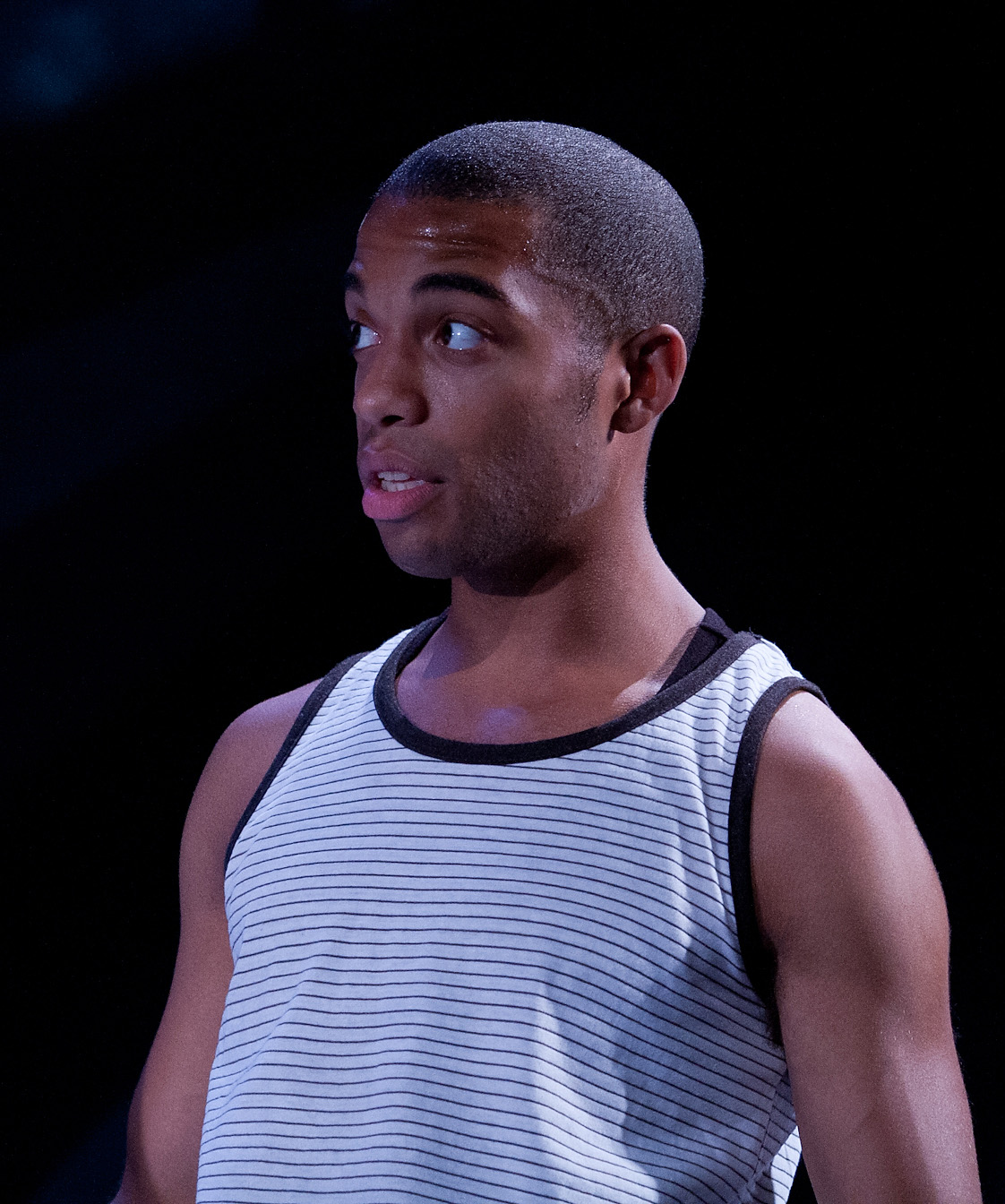
- Born: March 1991 (age 35); London, England
- Education: BRIT School; Royal Central School of Speech and Drama
- Occupation: Actor
- Years active: 2008–present
- Television: Jericho; Van der Valk

Elliot Barnes-Worrell (born March 1991) is an English theatre and film actor known for his role as Easter in the ITV drama series Jericho (2016) and as Job Cloovers in the ITV crime drama series Van der Valk (2020).

== Early life ==
Barnes-Worrell grew up in Peckham in the London Borough of Southwark. His father is the West Indian author, director and composer Trix Worrell.

While Barnes-Worrell was artistically a rapper, he attended a performance of Hamlet in the Ovalhouse, in which an actor with black skin color played Hamlet. He took an interest and became a regular theatre goer. He began training as an actor at the BRIT School and then moved to the Royal Central School of Speech and Drama, where he graduated after winning the Sir John Gielgud Award. In 2012 he was awarded the Alan Bates Award by the Actors Center.

== Career ==
=== Filmography ===
Year	Title	Role	Notes
2009	Dog Endz	Corey (as Elliot Barnes-Worrell)	TV movie
2012	Doctor Who: Good as Gold	Torch Bearer	
2013	Woodhouse	Nathaniel	
2013	Agatha Christie's Poirot	Etienne De Souza	Episode: "Dead Man's Folly"
2016	Jericho	Easter	
2016	The Works	Harry	Producer
2016	Bloke Fears	Performer	Short Film
2018	The Dark Heart Therapy	The Dark heart	Short Film
2019	Soon Gone: A Windrush Chronicle	David	Episode six: Malcolm and David
2020	Dolittle	Captain William Derrick	
2020–2022	Van Der Valk	Job Cloovers	TV series
2025	Black Mirror	Quarterman	Episode: "Hotel Reverie"

=== Theatre ===
Year	Title	Role	Writer	Director	Venue
2012	The Loneliness of the Long Distance Runner	Colin Smith	Alan Sillitoe	Roy Williams	Theatre Royal York, York
2013	Richard II	Prince John	William Shakespeare	Gregory Doran	Royal Shakespeare Theatre, Stratford-upon-Avon
2014	Henry IV, Part I & Henry IV, Part II	Prince John / Francis	William Shakespeare	Gregory Doran	Royal Shakespeare Theatre, Stratford-upon-Avon
2014	The Two Gentlemen of Verona	Prince John	William Shakespeare	Simon Godwin	Royal Shakespeare Theatre, Stratford-upon-Avon
2015	Man and Superman	Henry Straker	George Bernard Shaw	Julian Spooner	Royal National Theatre, London
2017	Hamlet	Horatio	William Shakespeare	Robert Icke	The Almeida Theatre, London
2026	As You Like It	Orlando	William Shakespeare	Daniel Evans	Royal Shakespeare Company, Stratford-upon-Avon
