= Miroslav Šašek =

Czech illustrator and writer

Miroslav Šašek (18 November 1916 – 28 May 1980) was a Czech writer illustrator. He emigrated from Czechoslovakia to Switzerland, and lived also in France and West Germany. He is best known for a series of books for children, originally published by W. H. Allen & Co., titled This Is..., which he signed M. Sasek.

== Life ==
Šašek's family background was in milling: the family operated the "Lucký mlýn" mill at Chodovlice in northwest Bohemia. His father worked as an insurance agent to the south of Prague in Sedlčany, but died in 1926, after which he moved with his mother to Prague. In 1947 Miroslav Šašek moved with his wife Jindřiška (née Tumlířová) to Paris and started studying at the Ecole des Beaux-Arts. He finished the illustrations for the Czech edition of Gabriel Chevallier's novel Clochemerle (as Zvonokosy) and started preparatory work on drawings for a tourist guide for the city for the Czech publishing house Ladislav Kuncíř. He fled Prague in 1948 following the Communist coup d'état and worked as a producer for Radio Free Europe in Munich from 1951 to 1957.

This Is Paris appeared in 1959 after Šašek's extended visit to Paris. It ultimately grew into a series of eighteen books. Šašek's This Is London received the New York Times Choice of Best Illustrated Children's Book of the Year in 1959, as did This Is New York in 1960. This Is New York also received the Boy's Club of America Junior Books Award in 1961, while This Is the United Nations appeared on the International Board on Books for Young People Honor List in 1979.

In addition to texts and illustrations, Miroslav Šašek is the author of book covers and graphic design of many books both in the Czech Republic and other countries.

Miroslav Šašek lived in Paris. He died in Wettingen, where he lived with his sister.

== Bibliography ==
- Benjamin a tisíc mořských ďasů Kapitána Barnabáše (Prague: U Ladislav Kuncíř, 1947)
- Veselý kalendářík (Prague: Vyšehrad, 1948)
- Sedm mamlasů (text by Eduard Petiška, illustrated by Miroslav Šašek; Prague: Orbis, 1948; published in German as Die sieben Schlemihle, 1950)
- This Is Paris (1959, reissued 2004)
- This Is London (1959, reissued 2004)
- This Is Rome (1960, reissued 2007)
- This Is New York City (1960, reissued 2003)
- This Is Edinburgh (1961, reissued 2006)
- Stone is not Cold (1961)
- This Is Munich (1961, reissued in 2012)
- This Is Venice (1961, reissued 2005)
- This Is San Francisco (1962, reissued 2003)
- This Is Israel (1962, reissued 2008))
- This Is Cape Canaveral / This Is Cape Kennedy (1963, reissued as This Is The Way To The Moon 2009)
- Letters from Pompeii (Wilhelmina Femmster Jashemski, illustrated by Miroslav Sasek, 1963)
- This Is Ireland (1964, reissued 2005)
- This Is Hong Kong (1965, reissued 2007)
- This Is Greece (1966, reissued 2009)
- This Is Texas (1967, reissued 2006)
- This Is the United Nations (1968)
- This Is Washington, D.C. (1969)
- This Is Australia (1970, reissued 2009)
- Mike and the Modelmakers (1970)
- This Is Historic Britain (1974, reissued as This is Britain 2008)
- Zoo ist das Leben - Satierische Verse (Max Colpet, illustrated by Horst Lemke and Miroslav Sasek, 1974)
- This Is The World (2014: "A Global Treasury," selections from the "This is" series)
