= Mona Moore =

English painter (1917-2000)

- Born: 20 March 1917; London, England
- Died: 20 September 2000 (aged 83); Oxford, England
- Education: St Martin's School of Art; Central School of Arts and Crafts
- Known for: Painting, drawing

Mona Mary Moore (20 March 1917 – 20 September 2000), also known as Mona Bentin and later as Deborah Bentin, was a British painter and illustrator, best known for her work during World War Two for both the Recording Britain project and for the War Artists' Advisory Committee. Her work also appeared regularly in a number of magazines including Good Housekeeping, the Radio Times and The Listener.

== Early life ==
Moore was born in London and attended school at St. Martin's-in-the-Fields before, at the age of fourteen, obtaining a scholarship to St Martin's School of Art. In 1933 she was awarded another scholarship which allowed her to remain at St. Martin's until she was nineteen. Moore then studied at the Central School of Arts and Crafts where she learnt the techniques of lithography. She left the Central School in 1939 and the same summer married Tony Bentin, who had also been an art student.

== World War Two ==
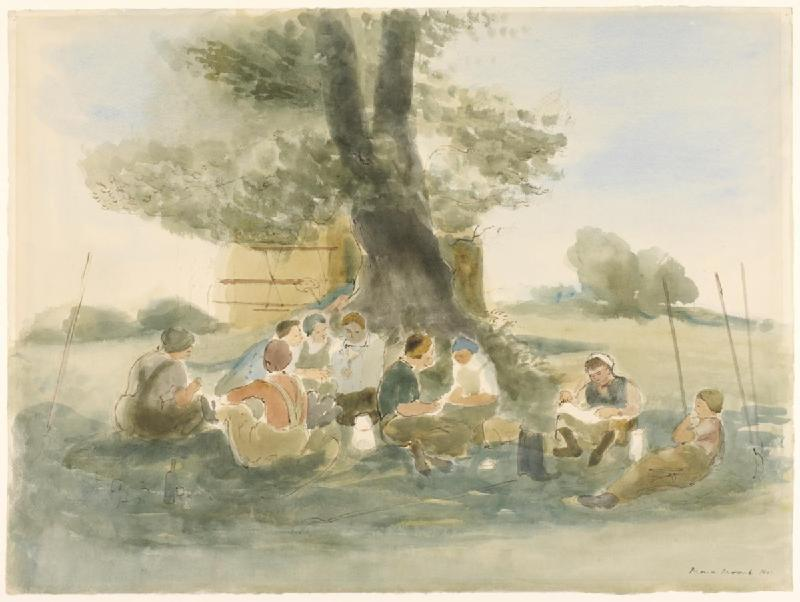
Land-girls Lunching in the Harvest Fields (1941) (Art.IWM ART LD 1469)

At the start of the Second World War, Tony Bentin served with the Royal Artillery on an anti-aircraft battery in England whilst Moore obtained work as an artist with the Pilgrim Trust on the Recording Britain scheme. Moore had connections in the Gower Peninsula, near Swansea, and was allowed to work there, painting landscapes for the project. After her first stay of two weeks on Gower, the Trust authorised her to return there and work on more landscapes. Moore arrived back in Swansea in March 1941, shortly after the city had suffered three days of bombing raids, known as the Swansea Blitz. Seeing the devastation of the city centre, she decided to stay in Swansea and record the bomb damage and the ongoing recovery work. One morning, returning to complete a picture started the previous day near Swansea Castle, Moore found the pile of rubble she been working on had been cordoned off as overnight an unexploded bomb had been detected beneath it. A photograph of Moore sketching at her easel on the rubble heap the previous day was printed on the front of the South Wales Evening Post on 18 March 1941.

The Pilgrim Trust next gave Moore the task of recording construction work at a site in Norfolk, where a new airfield was being built. Despite having the correct permit to sketch at the location, the RAF arrested her and she was held in custody for several hours until interviewed by a local police inspector and released. Moore also painted street-scenes in Great Yarmouth for Recording Britain and in all, had twenty views of Wales and eight from Norfolk accepted for the project.

In August 1941, the War Artists' Advisory Committee commissioned Moore to record the Women's Land Army working on the harvest in Essex. Moore completed a number of paintings on the subject and was paid 15 guineas for three of them by WAAC. Kenneth Clark, the director of the National Gallery privately commissioned Moore to go, in secret, to Blaenau Ffestiniog to the disused slate mine where the paintings from the Gallery had been evacuated during the Blitz. Later in life, Moore would recall the "remarkable experience" of entering the slate mine and seeing "priceless Rembrandts, Van Dycks and Turners, etc stacked in racks". Moore spent three weeks at Blaenau Ffestiniog and Clark later gave the drawings she produced there as "thank-you" presents to the staff who had engineered the evacuation of the collection. Moore's paintings from East Anglia were included in the June 1942 exhibition of the Queen's pictures held at the National Gallery in London. Also, during the war, in 1944, Moore produced 16 colour lithographs and the cover illustration for the book Sea Poems by Myfanwy Piper which were well reviewed. Moore's painting The Agony in the Garden won the £200 first prize in a competition for religious images.

== Later life ==
After the War, Moore worked regularly as an illustrator for the Radio Times, the Daily Express, Good Housekeeping and The Listener. Her work for the Radio Times included illustrations for broadcasts of The Cherry Orchard by Chekhov and They by Rudyard Kipling. In 1948 she produced two posters for the London Transport Executive, entitled London's Open Air, The Trees. She designed the jacket covers of Alan Sillitoe's first two books, Saturday Night and Sunday Morning in 1958 and The Loneliness of the Long Distance Runner the following year. Moore and her husband both became followers of the Subud spiritual movement and also both changed their names, eventually being known as Phillip and Deborah Bentin. In the 1960s, an eye infection which did not respond to treatment led to Moore becoming blind and ended her artistic career. Moore wrote an unpublished autobiography and gave oral history interviews to both the academic Gill Clarke and the Imperial War Museum. Paintings by Moore are held by the Imperial War Museum, IWM, the Victoria and Albert Museum and the British Museum. Works by Moore were included in War Fields, the 2004 loan exhibition organized by the IWM at the Wolsey Art Gallery in Ipswich.
