= A Start in Life (Sillitoe novel) =

1970 novel by Alan Sillitoe

- First edition
- Author: Alan Sillitoe
- Language: English
- Genre: Picaresque
- Publisher: W. H. Allen & Co.
- Publication date: 1970
- Publication place: United Kingdom
- Media type: Print

A Start in Life is a 1970 picaresque novel by the British writer Alan Sillitoe. It was followed by a sequel Life Goes On in 1985.

== Synopsis ==
Michael Cullen abandons his pregnant girlfriend in Nottingham and heads south to London where he becomes mixed-up with a smuggling racket. Eventually caught and sent to prison, he eventually decides to return to a quiet life in the provinces.

== Bibliography ==
- Gillian Mary Hanson. Understanding Alan Sillitoe. University of South Carolina Press, 1999
