= The Widower's Son =

1976 novel by Alan Sillitoe

- First edition
- Author: Alan Sillitoe
- Language: English
- Genre: Drama
- Publisher: W. H. Allen & Co.
- Publication date: 1976
- Publication place: United Kingdom
- Media type: Print

The Widower's Son is a 1976 novel by the British writer Alan Sillitoe. It tells the story of a man who leaves the Nottinghamshire coal mines after his friend is killed in an accident and, to his father's disgust, joins the army. When his wife dies, he has to bring up their son alone.

It was reviewed in the New Statesman by Julian Barnes who, while more sympathetic than he had been to a recent novel by another of the 'angry young men' John Braines Waiting for Sheila, claimed that the author's "prose still tends to confuse awkwardness with integrity".

== Bibliography ==
- Vanessa Guignery. Julian Barnes from the Margins: Exploring the Writer's Archives. Bloomsbury Publishing, 5 Mar 2020.
