= The Death of William Posters =

1965 novel by Alan Sillitoe

- First edition
- Author: Alan Sillitoe
- Language: English
- Genre: Drama
- Publisher: W. H. Allen & Co.
- Publication date: 1965
- Publication place: United Kingdom
- Media type: Print

The Death of William Posters is a 1965 novel by the British writer Alan Sillitoe. It is the first in a trilogy featuring the Nottingham factory worker Frank Dawley, followed by A Tree on Fire (1967) and The Flame of Life (1974).

== Bibliography ==
- Gillian Mary Hanson. Understanding Alan Sillitoe. University of South Carolina Press, 1999
