= The Open Door (Sillitoe novel) =

First edition (publ. Grafton Books)

The Open Door is a 1989 novel by Alan Sillitoe. It is the third and final part of the Seaton family trilogy which commenced with Saturday Night and Sunday Morning (1958) and then Key to the Door (1961).
