= The General (Sillitoe novel) =

1960 novel by Alan Sillitoe

- First edition
- Author: Alan Sillitoe
- Cover artist: Peter Rudland
- Language: English
- Genre: War drama
- Publisher: W. H. Allen & Co.
- Publication date: 1960
- Publication place: United Kingdom
- Media type: Print

The General is a 1960 novel by the British writer Alan Sillitoe. Unlike his previous realist works, the novel relies heavily on abstract symbolism.

During a war a General intercepts an orchestra and imprisons them in a barn where he and the orchestra leader debate the major issues of life. Eventually, won over, the General releases them and is in turn arrested by his own soldiers for disobeying orders.

== Adaptation ==
In 1968 it was adapted into the American film Counterpoint directed by Ralph Nelson and starring Charlton Heston, Maximilian Schell and Leslie Nielsen. The film took the overall plot of the novel, but altered it into a more definite setting - during the latter stages of the Second World War.

== Bibliography ==
- Goble, Alan. The Complete Index to Literary Sources in Film. Walter de Gruyter, 1999.
- Hanson, Gillian Mary. Understanding Alan Sillitoe. University of South Carolina Press, 1999
