= Counterpoint (film) =

1968 film by Ralph Nelson

- Film Poster
- Directed by: Ralph Nelson
- Written by: James Lee (Screenplay); Joel Oliansky (Screenplay)
- Based on: The General by Alan Sillitoe
- Produced by: Richard Berg
- Starring: Charlton Heston; Maximilian Schell; Leslie Nielsen; Kathryn Hays
- Cinematography: Russell Metty
- Edited by: Howard Epstein
- Music by: Bronislau Kaper
- Production company: Universal Pictures
- Distributed by: Universal Pictures
- Release date: March 13, 1968 (New York City)
- Running time: 107 minutes
- Country: United States
- Language: English

Counterpoint is a 1968 war film starring Charlton Heston, Maximilian Schell, Kathryn Hays and Leslie Nielsen. It is based on the novel The General by Alan Sillitoe. In the United States the film was released as a double feature with Sergeant Ryker, a 1963 television film starring Lee Marvin.

== Plot ==
Lionel Evans is the director of a well-respected symphony orchestra touring European concert halls in Belgium in December 1944 in World War II. In the midst of one concert, the city where they are playing is attacked by German troops, and when Evans and his musicians try to escape, they are captured by Nazi soldiers led by Col. Arndt. Evans and the orchestra are taken to a castle where they are to bide their time before being executed; but it turns out that Arndt's superior, Gen. Schiller, is a big classical music fan. Schiller commands Evans and his symphony to prepare a special concert for the Nazis, but Evans realizes that the moment the concert is over, he and his musicians will be killed.

== Cast ==
- Charlton Heston as Evans
- Maximilian Schell as Schiller
- Kathryn Hays as Annabelle
- Leslie Nielsen as Victor
- Anton Diffring as Arndt
- Linden Chiles as Long
- Peter Masterson as Calloway
- Curt Lowens as Klingermann
- Neva Patterson as Dorothy
- Cyril Delevanti as Tartzoff
- Gregory Morton as Jordon
- Parley Baer as Hook
- Dan Frazer as Chaminant
- Ed Peck as Prescott

== Production ==
Filmed at Universal Studios including a set built for the 1923 film The Hunchback of Notre Dame, the film began shooting on 21 November 1966 and concluded 24 January 1967. Two days were removed from the production schedule and the script was rewritten without consulting the director Ralph Nelson.

=== Music ===
The orchestra's performances, which include works by Tchaikovsky, Beethoven, Brahms, Wagner, and Schubert, were performed by the Los Angeles Philharmonic Orchestra.

== Critical response ==
Writing in The New York Times, critic Vincent Canby speculated that the film was "manufactured on the company's back lot to give Universal City tourists something to gawk at," and described it as "an aggressively unbelievable melodrama" and an "anachronism." Film critic Roger Ebert described the film as having a "perverse charm and a lot of good classical music" and "atmosphere," but also reported that it had a "preposterous story" and "if only they had said the hell with it and made a Gothic horror movie they would have had something." A review of the film in TV Guide noted it was "one of those rare films in which Heston is not in a toga, a doublet, or spurs," and that "the best thing about the movie was the classical music [which is] what will be most remembered about this film."
