= The Empath =

- Star Trek: The Original Series episode
- Episode no.: Season 3 Episode 12
- Directed by: John Erman
- Written by: Joyce Muskat
- Cinematography by: Jerry Finnerman
- Production code: 063
- Original air date: December 6, 1968

Guest appearances
- Kathryn Hays – Gem; Alan Bergmann – Lal (Vian); Willard Sage – Thann (Vian); Davis Roberts – Dr. Ozaba; Jason Wingreen – Dr. Linke; Richard Geary – Security Guard; William Blackburn – Lt. Hadley; Roger Holloway – Lt. Lemli

Episode chronology
← Previous "Wink of an Eye"	Next → "Elaan of Troyius"
- Star Trek: The Original Series season 3

"The Empath" is the twelfth episode of the third season of the American science fiction television series Star Trek. Written by Joyce Muskat and directed by John Erman, it was first broadcast on December 6, 1968.

In the episode, while visiting a doomed planet, the landing party is subjected to brutal experiments by powerful aliens.

This episode is one of a handful not screened in the United Kingdom by the BBC for many years, owing to its disturbing content (torture). It was not broadcast by the BBC until January 1994.

== Plot ==
The starship USS Enterprise arrives at Minara II to recover research personnel as its star is about to go supernova. Captain Kirk, Dr. McCoy, and Science Officer Spock beam to the surface but find the research station deserted. Chief Engineer Scott moves Enterprise to a safe distance to protect it from being bombarded by a solar flare.

The landing party is suddenly transported to an underground chamber and discover that they are trapped along with a beautiful mute woman, whom McCoy names "Gem". The landing party is attacked by two Vians, Lal and Thann, humanoids with huge craniums. They proceed to injure Kirk. Gem proves to be an empath by absorbing Kirk's injuries, briefly taking them on herself before they are healed.

The four search the nearby chambers and find machinery and computer systems, along with transparent cylinders, some containing the missing research personnel in grotesque poses, and three empty ones labeled with the landing party's names. Lal arrives, but Spock subdues him with a Vulcan nerve pinch, allowing the group to escape to the surface. They are surprised to see Scott and a landing party waiting for them, but soon discover they are only a mirage. The Vians arrive and transport Gem and Kirk back into the underground complex, where they begin torturing Kirk as Gem watches. During this, the aliens explain that they had tested the research personnel (Linke and Ozaba) similarly, but both men died from their fears.

Gem and a badly injured Kirk are transported back to where McCoy and Spock are held, and Gem heals Kirk's wounds, but only after McCoy urges her to do so. The Vians demand another test subject, and McCoy sedates Kirk and Spock to prevent them from going. When Kirk and Spock awaken, they understand from Gem what McCoy has done and escape to find McCoy near death in the medical chamber.

Kirk and Spock attempt to help McCoy but are stopped by a force field. They watch as Gem attempts to absorb McCoy's wounds, though she seems afraid to take them completely upon herself. The Vians explain that is a test of Gem as a representative of her people: if she is willing to sacrifice her life for that of another, the Vians, who can save only one race from the coming supernova, will choose hers. Gem attempts again to absorb McCoy's wounds but he pushes her away, not wanting her to die. Spock observes the force field reacts to resistant force, and theorizes that total calm would dissipate the field, allowing them the opportunity to overcome the Vians. Kirk pleads that Gem has proven her willingness to sacrifice herself, and accuses the aliens of lacking compassion. The Vians, apparently in agreement, return Gem and McCoy to full health, and promise to save Gem's people. They and Gem disappear.

Kirk, Spock and McCoy return to the Enterprise safely. After hearing the trio discussing the probability of meeting a woman like Gem, Scott comments that she must have been a "pearl of great price", and they agree.

== Production ==
=== Writing and conception ===
Star Trek fan Joyce Muskat, fresh out of UC Berkeley, was working as a newspaper reporter when she wrote her first television script, "The Answerer". It was inspired by the 1933 science fiction novel When Worlds Collide, and also by an ancient Egyptian custom of inviting a person to speak on behalf of another who was being judged. Muskat was also working at a local theater, and wanted her story to be shot on a bare, surreal set, like a stage play that focused on the characters. Her theater employer, playwright and screenwriter Robert Fisher, liked the script and, acting as her agent, submitted it. Star Trek producers Gene Roddenberry, Fred Freiberger and Robert Justman all thought it had promise, but agreed there would have to be some changes. Muskat reworked the script based on their input. Freiberger, Justman and story consultant Arthur Singer made further changes and Singer also gave the story a new title, "The Empath". Since Muskat was not a member of the Writers Guild, Star Trek would be saving money, which was becoming very tight.

=== Direction and casting ===
Star Trek associate producer Robert Justman had worked on an episode of The Outer Limits called "Nightmare", which also dealt with men being brutally interrogated by aliens on a minimalistic set. The episode was directed by John Erman, and Justman hired him for "The Empath", given their similar themes. Erman in turn hired a few actors he had previously worked with. He remembered Kathryn Hays from his time as a casting director, and recommended her for the part of Gem. She had also impressed Gene Roddenberry in an episode of Naked City that he had written. The actors who played the Vians (Lal and Thann) were friends of Erman. Willard Sage (Thann) had also worked on the Outer Limits episode. Alan Bergmann played the main Vian, Lal. He was reluctant at first, as the part sounded limited and he didn't like the idea of wearing grotesque makeup, but Erman eventually persuaded him, and promised to expand his role.

=== Filming ===
Filming began on Thursday, July 25, 1968. There was a delay due to Shatner, Nimoy and Kelley being unhappy with elements of the script, and various injuries and illnesses including Kelley suffering a back spasm. The scenes on the surface of the planet were filmed first, then the cast and crew moved to Paramount's giant Marathon stage 1, dressed as the surrealistic underground chamber. Guest star Kathryn Hays recalled, "A cyclorama went around the entire studio set right up against the walls and that, along with the floors and ceilings, was painted black, so it looked like we were out in space." Filming finished on Friday, August 2, one full day behind due to the problems at the start of the shoot. This was to be cinematographer Jerry Finnerman's last Star Trek episode; he had been with the show since the first episode. This was also the only Star Trek assignment for director John Erman. He did not enjoy the experience, due to Shatner and Nimoy wishing to direct themselves. Erman later said, "Nobody was like Bill and Lenny. I don't remember any other actors saying what those guys said, which was, 'Oh no, my character just wouldn't do that.' That was the ultimate put down for a director." Guest star Alan Bergmann recalled, "Mr. Shatner and Mr. Nimoy seemed to be in conflict. They struggled over better camera positions and made life difficult for the director."

=== Music ===
"The Empath" has a distinctive music score, composed by George Duning. His use of the Yamaha organ was, according to the composer himself, the first time that the electronic instrument (newly arrived from Japan) was featured in a Hollywood film score. The enchanting theme for Gem was used in multiple subsequent episodes during tender, romantic scenes.

== Reception ==
=== Broadcast ===
"The Empath" was broadcast on NBC at 10 pm on Friday, December 6, 1968. It was the second most-watched season three episode (after the season opener, "Spock's Brain"), with 34 percent of the audience share. It was not repeated on NBC in summer 1969 because the torture scenes were considered too graphic for the earlier time slot.

In the UK, the BBC decided to cancel the scheduled 16 December 1970 screening of the episode (it was listed in the Radio Times), following the screening of "Miri" two weeks previously, which had received a number of complaints from viewers. This caused the BBC to look at Star Trek more closely, resulting in the banning of both episodes along with "Plato's Stepchildren" and "Whom Gods Destroy". Fans writing to the BBC prior to another repeat run in 1984 received this reply: "There are no plans to screen the four episodes because we feel that they deal most unpleasantly with the already unpleasant subjects of madness, torture, sadism and disease." The episodes were not screened by the BBC until the 1990s.

=== Cast and crew response ===
This was one of DeForest Kelley's favorite episodes. He said, "I thought it was so dramatically done. The entire stage was blacked out in black curtains, and everything was done in 'pen spots'. It was so unique in production values and the cinematography on it." Guest star Kathryn Hays recalled in an interview, "I’ve often thought that was an interesting role for me to play. I loved playing that. It was technically very interesting. That show was fascinating to work on from a technical point of view. It was so different from a regular show." Guest star Alan Bergmann said, "Given the minimal sets and the ludicrous pajama-like costumes of the regulars, the episode was quite successful in text and production." Writer Joyce Muskat said, "When I saw it, there were a lot of changes. But the storyline of Gem learning something is the same, and the idea of the stark setting and four characters interacting was still there. So I couldn't find fault with it. I was very satisfied."

=== Critical response ===
In 2015, Polygon ranked "The Empath" as one of the three best Spock-centric episodes of Star Trek. They praised the episode for its moralistic conclusion and what they call the best acting performance by Nimoy, who plays Spock. However, some critics view this as one of the most controversial episodes, due to its gratuitous violence and questionable moral tone.

A 2018 Star Trek binge-watching guide by Den of Geek, recommended this episode for featuring the trio of characters Kirk, Spock, and Bones of the original series.

== Home video releases ==
This episode was released in Japan on December 21, 1993, as part of the complete season 3 LaserDisc set, Star Trek: Original Series log.3. A trailer for this and the other episodes was also included, and the episode had English and Japanese audio tracks. The cover script was スター・トレック TVサードシーズン

This episode was included in TOS Season 3 remastered DVD box set, with the remastered version of this episode.
