= Yuma (1971 film) =

1971 TV film

- Genre: Western
- Written by: Charles A. Wallace
- Directed by: Ted Post
- Starring: Clint Walker; Barry Sullivan; Kathryn Hays; Edgar Buchanan; Morgan Woodward; John Kerr
- Music by: George Duning
- Country of origin: United States
- Original language: English

Production
- Producer: Aaron Spelling
- Cinematography: John M. Stephens (as John Stephens)
- Editor: Art Seid
- Running time: 74 minutes
- Production companies: ABC Circle Films; Aaron Spelling Productions

Original release
- Network: ABC
- Release: March 2, 1971

Yuma is a 1971 American Western television film directed by Ted Post and starring Clint Walker in the lead role. It was shot in Old Tucson. The film was originally a television pilot that appeared on the ABC Movie of the Week. The film was directed by Ted Post and stars Clint Walker, Barry Sullivan, Kathryn Hays, Edgar Buchanan, Morgan Woodward, and John Kerr.

== Plot ==
Dave Harmon, a former Lieutenant in the U.S. Army, is sent to Yuma as an Arizona Territory Deputy U.S. Marshal. His wife was raped, son killed and the only description of the criminals responsible was they were wearing U.S. Army uniforms. Harmon subsequently becomes a Deputy U.S. Marshal and takes postings near several U.S. Army posts to conduct his own investigation. Yuma is a city with a U.S. Army post commanded by Major Lucas and an Indian Reservation nearby.

On his first day, Harmon encounters two drunk criminals, the King brothers, who have just hijacked and robbed a stagecoach outside of town. Harmon sets about dealing with the brothers, arresting and jailing one for theft and killing the other in self-defense at the town saloon after provoking him into drawing his gun.

The second brother that had been arrested is subsequently shot in the back using a gun from the U.S. Marshal's office during a nighttime jail break organized by Sanders, a corrupt agent of the local freight company baron. They set this in motion in an effort to get the third King brother, an honest cattleman, to kill the Deputy Marshal.

The murderer also has the Major's subordinate, Captain White, assist him in the crime, as the freight owner, Sanders and the Captain are all involved in an ongoing scheme to defraud the Indian Reservation out of cattle they need for food that is due them in accordance with a peace treaty.

The only witness to the break-in is Andres, a Mexican orphan boy who had earlier been taken in by Harmon. He was asleep on the floor in the jail when awoken by the noise of the break-in but only manages to see the boots of the killers, one pair being the distinct U.S. Cavalry boots worn by Captain White.

The third King brother rides into town and demands justice. He gives Harmon time to find the murderer but promises to take his vengeance if he fails. Harmon sets out to find the killer and unravel the related corruption involving the Indian Reservation, who threaten to revolt but come to his assistance as the story unfolds.

== Cast ==
- Clint Walker as U.S. Marshal Dave Harmon
- Barry Sullivan as Nels Decker, freight company owner
- Kathryn Hays as Julie Williams, the hotel owner
- Edgar Buchanan as Mules McNeil, a competing freight company owner
- Morgan Woodward as Arch King, cattleman
- John Kerr as Captain White
- Peter Mark Richman as Major Lucas
- Bing Russell as Rol King
- Robert Phillips as Sanders
- Miguel Alejandro as Andres, a Mexican orphan boy hired by Harmon to work in the jail

== Critical response ==
Dennis Schwartz of Dennis Schwartz Movie Reviews thought the film was well acted, but was unimpressed with the film as a whole.

Jayne Nelson of Radio Times wrote: "Producer Aaron Spelling had tried to make a western TV series. Ted Post's sluggish direction made the film look cheesy and artificial."
