= Van der Valk (2020 TV series) =

British TV crime drama set in Amsterdam

- Title card
- Genre: Crime drama; Mystery
- Created by: Chris Murray
- Inspired by: Van der Valk novels by Nicolas Freeling
- Written by: Chris Murray; Maria Ward
- Starring: Marc Warren; Maimie McCoy; Luke Allen-Gale; Elliot Barnes-Worrell; Darrell D'Silva; Emma Fielding; Django Chan-Reeves; Azan Ahmed; Kim Riedle
- Composer: Matthijs Kieboom
- Country of origin: United Kingdom
- Original language: English
- No. of series: 4
- No. of episodes: 12

Production
- Executive producers: Michele Buck; Chris Murray; Marc Warren; Louise Pedersen; Rebecca Eaton; David Swetman
- Producers: Keith Thompson; Sabine Brian; Ronald Versteeg
- Production location: Netherlands
- Cinematography: Tibor Dingelstad; Willem Helwig; Coen Stroeve
- Editor
- Running time: 90 minutes
- Production companies: Company Pictures; NL Film; ARD Degeto; PBS

Original release
- Network: ITV
- Release: 26 April 2020 – 16 August 2026

Related
- Van der Valk

Van der Valk is a British television crime drama series that premiered on ITV in 2020. It is a loose remake of the original Van der Valk series that ran from 1972 to 1992 on ITV. Adapted from the eponymous series of crime thriller novels by Nicolas Freeling, the reboot was created and written by Chris Murray, with Marc Warren starring as police detective Van der Valk. Continuity with the original series is not preserved in the remake, which introduces revised and new characters as well as new storylines.

Van der Valk premiered in the United Kingdom on 26 April 2020, the second series on 7 August 2022, and the third series on 18 June 2023. The fourth and final series premiered on 2 August 2026.

== Overview ==
The series is set in present-day Amsterdam, where police Commissioner Piet van der Valk investigates challenging cases with his partner Lucienne Hassell and colleagues in the National Police Force's major crimes division.

== Cast and characters ==
=== Main ===
- Marc Warren as Commissaris Piet van der Valk
- Maimie McCoy as Inspecteur Lucienne Hassell
- Luke Allen-Gale as Brigadier (Sergeant) Brad de Vries (series 1–2)
- Elliot Barnes-Worrell as Job Cloovers (series 1–2)
- Darrell D'Silva as Hendrik Davie, a police forensic pathologist
- Emma Fielding as Hoofdcommissaris Julia Dahlman
- Django Chan-Reeves as Sergeant Citra Li (series 3)
- Azan Ahmed as Sergeant Eddie Suleman (series 3–4)
- Kim Riedle as Sergeant Kalie Tenkers (series 4)

=== Recurring ===
- Loes Haverkort as Lena Linderman (series 2–4)
- Peter van Heeringen as Homeless Frank (series 1–3)
- Mike Libanon as Cliff Palache

== Episodes ==
Series	Episodes	Originally released	
Series	Episodes	First released	Last released
1	3	26 April 2020	10 May 2020
2	3	7 August 2022	21 August 2022
3	3	18 June 2023	2 July 2023
4	3	2 August 2026	16 August 2026

=== Series 1 (2020) ===
No. overall	No. in series	Title	Directed by	Written by	Original release date	UK viewers (millions)
1	1	"Love in Amsterdam"	Colin Teague	Chris Murray	26 April 2020	7.13
With elections looming, Van der Valk and his team delve into the worlds of art and politics as they investigate the seemingly unlinked murders of two innocents.
2	2	"Only in Amsterdam"	Max Porcelijn	Chris Murray	3 May 2020	6.01
An investigation into the murder of a young woman with an interest in medieval erotica becomes entangled with a nunnery, mystical academics, and a controversial drug clinic.
3	3	"Death in Amsterdam"	Jean van de Velde	Chris Murray	10 May 2020	5.5
The fashion industry, video bloggers and a graffiti artist come under investigation after a macabre murder. Van der Valk has flashbacks and a sexual liaison.

=== Series 2 (2022) ===
No. overall	No. in series	Title	Directed by	Written by	Original release date	UK viewers (millions)
4	1	"Plague on Amsterdam"	Jean van de Velde	Chris Murray	7 August 2022	4.31
Van der Valk is called in to investigate the grisly and theatrical murder of solicitor Susie de Windt. A cryptic note discovered within her jacket alludes to further murders and a link to philosopher Baruch de Spinoza is also uncovered. Job deduces that further notes on newer victims are different quotes by Spinoza, which also alludes to events Amsterdam went through in history with three Xs, including a flood and a fire. Van der Valk and his team also take down de Windt's husband, who is revealed to have blackmailed city hall to keep quiet about the eviction of people with a different life style. As the investigation narrows in a former run-by person, Tonie Alderlink, Job and Van der Valk deduce that is in fact the killer, and has compared himself and looked up to Spinoza. As Alderlink livestreams himself at a pier in The Hague, Van der Valk tries to talk him down, but the chief of police ultimately orders snipers to take Alderlink out. The bomb he was wearing is also revealed to have been fake, going against his last philosophy of God being killed.
5	2	"Blood in Amsterdam"	André van Duren	Chris Murray	14 August 2022	3.85
When Ahmed Baykan, an employee of the renowned Cuypers Diamonds, is killed and his body delivered in pieces to the wealthy siblings and heirs to the company, Van der Valk and his team navigate a string of complicated family and staff affairs and consider a possible tale of revenge against the family. Among their findings are that following their mother's death, a new diamond was made in her honour, and a disgruntled employee, Jacob Prins, threatened to sue the company over the direction it was heading. Baykan is also revealed to be the brother of gangster Yusuf Baykan, who personally goes after Prins and later pressures Cornelis Cuyper into giving him 500,000 euros. Baykan was also headed to a date with Angelina Cuyper the day he died, and it is revealed that he was confronted by fellow employer Vito Vinke, who had wanted the same job as him. The family doctor is later found dead in a safe where the mother's diamond was stored, and Prins is later stabbed while leaving a ferry. Van der Valk and his team consider the crimes to have been an inside job, and partial DNA leaves an open gap to all three siblings until some remaining traces from a ring points them to the family psychotherapist Florian Barby. They catch him in his escape, and it is revealed that the mother, Geraldine Cuyper, is alive and had faked her death, in addition to having killed Baykan, while Barby helped in cleaning up.
6	3	"Payback in Amsterdam"	Joram Lürsen	Chris Murray and Maria Ward	21 August 2022	3.91
When Fleur Mas, a promising cellist from a prestigious orchestra, dies following an acid attack, Van der Valk and his team delve into the city's vibrant but eclectic classical music scene in the search for her killer. They discover a disturbing sex trafficking ring headed by Stefan Bodecker, which Mas was a part of, and cross paths with Lucienne's ex-girlfriend, Femke de Haan, who was in a relationship with Mas prior to her death. Every turn they take leads to a victim being killed, including Van der Valk's journalist friend, Arjan Hersei, at the hands of Bodecker's enforcer Ivo De Witt. When an Interpol search in the Mediterranean fails to find Bodecker, Van der Valk and the police find suspicious leads that point to him being back in the Netherlands. As De Witt targets de Haan, she manages to disable him with pepper spray before seeking refuge in a windmill before Lucienne and Van der Valk rescue her. Club owner Anouk Prinsens is Bodecker's daughter and was possibly abused by him as a child. Despite denying the accusations against him, Bodecker reveals that he planned to have incriminating footage of high ranking officials engaging with girls leaked to the press. Van der Valk goes back and solves a clue Arjan left with a book, leading to a locker under the Central Station containing the evidence he gathered. As the police execute a mass arrest of all officials involved, including their boss Jan Ludlow, another victim of Bodecker, Hester Gill, assassinates him as he is brought from the police station.

=== Series 3 (2023) ===
No. overall	No. in series	Title	Directed by	Written by	Original release date	UK viewers (millions)
7	1	"Freedom in Amsterdam"	Michiel van Jaarsveld	Chris Murray	18 June 2023	3.80
The team are plunged into an investigation following the dramatic shooting of an idealistic Freerunning champion, which draws them into the murky world of drug smuggling.
8	2	"Redemption in Amsterdam"	Simone van Dusseldorp	Maria Ward	25 June 2023	3.72
The present-day murder of a museum employee involved in the restitution of ancient artefacts links back to a case Van der Valk worked on at the beginning of his career, alongside boss Julia Dahlman’s ex-husband, when a troubled teenage girl seemingly burnt her younger siblings to death.
9	3	"Magic in Amsterdam"	Arne Toonen	Chris Murray	2 July 2023	3.75
The team are taken to the edge of reality following the death of a participant in a magical ritual invoking a demon. Is there a supernatural cause for the murder, or is there a much more earthbound explanation?

=== Series 4 (2026) ===
No. overall	No. in series	Title	Directed by	Written by	Original release date	UK viewers (millions)
10	1	"Safe in Amsterdam"	Michiel van Jaarsveld	Chris Murray	2 August 2026	2.86
Van Der Valk and the team are pushed to the limit as they try to bring down the matriarchal head of a criminal empire who may or may not be guilty of the crimes she's accused of committing.
11	2	"Hope in Amsterdam"	Eché Janga	Maria Ward	9 August 2026	2.76
Van Der Valk and the team are confronted with a unique emotional puzzle when the prime suspect in their latest murder investigation turns out to be a famous singer and missing person presumed to have been dead for years.
12	3	"Secrets in Amsterdam"	Paula van der Oest	Chris Murray	16 August 2026	2.68
The team investigates a series of murders that draw them into a cryptic puzzle which could not only unlock a potentially life-saving medical breakthrough but also have a major impact on the health of one of them.

== Production ==
=== Development ===
Van der Valk is produced by Company Pictures, NL Film, ARD Degeto, and PBS, with All3Media as international distributor.

In this remake, Piet is a widower and his sidekick Lucienne Hassell is lesbian. A key riff from the original 1972 series' distinctive theme music, "Eye Level", is echoed in the new theme music.

In May 2020, Warren confirmed that the show would return for a second series, although production might be delayed due to the COVID-19 pandemic. Nevertheless, with actors, crew, and logistics established, filming on season 2 began with safety measures in place on 3 June 2021.

A third series was commissioned on 11 April 2022. Filming on Series 3 was completed in August 2022. With the departure of Elliot Barnes-Worrell and Luke Allen-Gale from the series, two new characters are introduced in Series 3: Sergeant Citra Li, played by Django Chan-Reeves, and Sergeant Eddie Suleman, played by Azan Ahmed.

In July 2023, it was reported that the series was preparing to commence production of a fourth series. In Series 4, Kim Riedle joined the main cast as police Sergeant Kalie Tenkers, van der Valk's ex-girlfriend.

=== Locations ===
Series 1 was filmed entirely in Amsterdam. Locations include the American Hotel, the Rijksmuseum, Achtergracht, NDSM, the Tommy Hilfiger HQ on Danzigerkade in Houthaven, REM Eiland, Nieuwe Teertuinen, Kadijken, Scharrebiersluis bridge, Plantage, and the Prinseneilandsgracht.

Series 2 was filmed in Amsterdam, Utrecht, and The Hague. Locations include Scheveningen Pier, the Muziekgebouw, A'DAM Tower, and Café Scheltema.

== Release ==
=== Broadcast ===
The show premiered in the United Kingdom on ITV on 26 April 2020, with series 1 consisting of three 90-minute episodes.

In the Netherlands, Van der Valk debuted on NPO 1 on 1 January 2020. In Germany, the series premiered on Das Erste on 1 June 2020. In the United States, it debuted on PBS on 13 September 2020. In Australia, it premiered on ABC TV on 4 April 2020, and in New Zealand on Vibe on 25 May 2020. In Belgium, it debuted on VRT 1 on 4 September 2020.

In the UK, Van der Valk series 1 averaged 7.1 million viewers.

The second series premiered in the UK on 7 August 2022, and in the U.S. on 25 September 2022.

In 2022, distribution of Van der Valk became available in Italy on Discovery, France on France Télévisions, Norway on NRK, Sweden on TV4, Croatia on HRT, and Spain on Cosmopolitan. The series was also acquired by NHK in Japan, ViuTVsix in Hong Kong, DirecTV in Latin America and BBC Global Channels in Africa.

In June 2023, ITV announced that the third series would premiere on 18 June 2023. The series premiered first in Denmark on TV 2 Charlie on 3 January 2023, then debuted on ABC in Australia on 24 March 2023, and on PBS in the US on 3 September 2023.

Series 4 premiered in Denmark first on TV 2 Charlie on 22 July 2024. It aired in Australia on ABC on 30 August 2024, and on PBS in the US on 15 September 2024. In October 2025, ITV announced that the fourth series was scheduled for broadcast in 2026. In July 2026, ITV confirmed the UK premiere of Series 4 on 2 August 2026.

=== Home media ===
Series 1 was released on DVD in Region 2 by Dazzler Media on 11 May 2020, and in Region 4 by ABC on 20 May 2020. It was released in Region 1 by PBS on 13 October 2020.

The Series 2 DVD was released first in Region 4 on 13 April 2022, followed by Region 2 on 22 August 2022, and Region 1 on 11 October 2022.
