= This Is... (book series) =

Series of children's travel books

This Is Paris (1959), the first book in Sasek's This Is... series

This Is... is a series of children's travel books written and illustrated by Czech author Miroslav Sasek between 1959 and 1974.

Sasek originally intended to write three books (This Is Paris, This Is London and This Is Rome); however, as a result of those titles' popularity, Sasek ultimately extended the series to 18 books.

Four of the This Is books were adapted into movie shorts by Weston Woods in the early 1960s: This Is New York, This Is Venice, This Is Israel and This Is Ireland.

The This Is series was published in the United Kingdom by W. H. Allen & Co. and in the United States by The Macmillan Company, and in translation in several other countries. In 2003, after those series went out of print, the Rizzoli publishing firm began reissuing some of the titles, although not in the original publication order. In these books, outdated facts were updated at the back of the book but the original artwork was preserved.

== Books in the series ==
- This Is Paris (1959) (republished 2004)
- This Is London (1959) (republished 2004)
- This Is Rome (1960) (republished 2007)
- This Is New York (1960) (republished 2003)
- This Is Edinburgh (1961) (republished 2006)
- This Is Munich (1961) (republished 2012)
- This Is Venice (1961) (republished 2005)
- This Is San Francisco (1962) (republished 2003)
- This Is Israel (1962) (republished 2008)
- This Is Cape Canaveral (1963) (later republished as This Is Cape Kennedy) (republished 2009 as This Is the Way to the Moon)
- This Is Ireland (1964) (republished 2005)
- This Is Hong Kong (1965) (republished 2007)
- This Is Greece (1966) (republished 2009)
- This Is Texas (1967) (republished 2006)
- This Is the United Nations (1968)
- This Is Washington, D.C. (1969) (republished 2011)
- This Is Australia (1970) (republished 2009)
- This Is Historic Britain (1974) (republished 2008 as This Is Britain)

Compilation

- This Is the World: A Global Treasury (published 2014: abridged versions of 16 titles in one volume – the excluded titles are Cape Canaveral and the United Nations)
