= The Loneliness of the Long-Distance Runner (short story collection) =

1959 short story collection by Alan Sillitoe

- First edition
- Author: Alan Sillitoe
- Cover artist: Mona Moore
- Language: English
- Genre: Social realism
- Publisher: W. H. Allen Ltd
- Publication date: 1959
- Publication place: United Kingdom
- Media type: Print
- Pages: 176

The Loneliness of the Long-Distance Runner is a short story collection by English author Alan Sillitoe.

== Stories ==
- "The Loneliness of the Long-Distance Runner":

A teenager from Nottingham is convicted for burgling a bakery and sent to Borstal, where he finds solace in long-distance running.

- "Uncle Ernest":

Ernest Brown the upholsterer is lonely and suffering from shell-shock. He feels guilty for surviving the trenches of World War I. His wife has left him, and he has lost touch with his family. One morning two young girls sit at his table in a cafe, disrupting his routine of introspection. He speaks to them and buys them cakes. In the weeks that follow, he regularly meets them and buys them food and gifts; they give him a reason to live. The police then tell him not to go near them again, and he turns to drink.

Sillitoe based the title character on a relative of his, Uncle Edgar, also an upholsterer warned away by police from two young girls he had befriended.

- "Mr. Raynor the Schoolteacher":

Ostensibly teaching teenage boys Religious Education, Mr. Raynor's attention wanders to the young women working in Harrison's, the draper's shop opposite his classroom window. He reflects on their physical merits whilst trying to maintain discipline among his students.

Again Sillitoe bases this story on his experiences and acquaintances: a teacher at his school who paid more attention to shop girls outside than to his class.

- "The Fishing-boat Picture":

In Nottingham, postman Harry looks back 28 years. His marriage to Kathy lasted six years before she left him for a housepainter. Ten years later she returned, having lost her vitality and seeming sad. She tells him the housepainter died from lead poisoning and asks for the eponymous picture. Harry gives it to her, later finds that she has pawned it and buys it back. Kathy returns every week for six years to borrow money, which he gives her for old time's sake. She takes and pawns the picture again, but Harry doesn't buy it back this time. She dies in a lorry accident. At the funeral, Harry sees the housepainter alive.

- "Noah's Ark":

Ten-year-old Colin and his cousin Bert visit the Goose Fair with only four pence between them. The resourceful Bert uses dishonest tricks to get more spending money. Their evening ends on the 'Noah's Ark', a carousel of different animals where they attempt to evade the attendant for a free ride.

- "On Saturday Afternoon":

A young boy helps a neighbour who tries to hang himself.

- "The Match":

After watching their team Notts County lose 2-1 to Bristol City, Lennox and Fred return to their neighbouring houses in The Meadows. Fred and his wife of one month overhear Lennox losing his temper and using violence against his wife.

- "The Disgrace of Jim Scarfedale":

The story of Jim Scarfedale is told by his neighbour as a cautionary tale against living at home too long. Jim, thought to be a mother's boy, marries with little announcement to the surprise and consternation of his domineering mother. The marriage lasts six months, after which Jim returns to his mother and is disgraced when discovered preying on little girls.

- "The Decline and Fall of Frankie Buller":

Alan Sillitoe recalls his childhood in Nottingham when he was in a gang led by Frankie Buller, a man in his early twenties with a mental age much lower. They made frequent raids into a nearby housing estate to battle a rival gang. The advent of World War II put a stop to Frankie's exploits.

- "The Rats":

Included in later editions of the book, the poem originally appeared in The Rats and Other Poems (1960. W. H. Allen).
