= The Loneliness of the Long-Distance Runner (short story) =

Short story by Alan Sillitoe

- Short story by Alan Sillitoe
- First edition cover
- Country: United Kingdom
- Language: English
- Genre: Social realism

Publication
- Published in: The Loneliness of the Long-Distance Runner
- Publisher: W. H. Allen Ltd
- Media type: Print (hardcover)
- Publication date: 1959

"The Loneliness of the Long-Distance Runner" is a short story by Alan Sillitoe, published in 1959 as part of a short story collection of the same title. The work focuses on Smith, a poor Nottingham teenager from a dismal home in a working class area, who has bleak prospects in life and few interests beyond petty crime. The boy experiences social alienation and turns to long-distance running as a method of both emotional and physical escape from his situation.

== Plot ==
Smith is a seventeen-year-old from a Nottingham council estate, serving time at Ruxton Towers, a Borstal in Essex, for robbing a bakery. The governor wants to show what his institution can do, so he picks Smith out as a runner and trains him for the Borstal Blue Ribbon Prize Cup, a cross-country race against Ranley, a nearby public school. Nobody spells out the deal, but Smith knows that if he wins his last months inside will be easy.

Smith tells the story himself after his release. He sees the world as split between "In-laws" like the governor and the police, and "Out-laws" like himself, and he has no intention of changing sides. The early-morning training runs are the only time he feels free. Out on the frozen fields he thinks about his father's death, the insurance money his mother spent, and the bakery job with his mate Mike, which fell apart when the stolen notes they had stuffed into a drainpipe washed out in the rain in front of a waiting detective.

On race day Smith is well in the lead, then stops a few yards short of the finishing line in full view of the governor and the crowd. He stands there while the Ranley runner goes past him and wins. He knows what this will cost him, and for the rest of his sentence the governor puts him on the worst jobs in the place. Smith doesn't care. Losing on purpose was his way of showing them he wasn't theirs. Back outside, he is still thieving, and he says he has left this account with a friend to be published if he is ever caught again.

== Literary analysis ==
=== The "runner" as a metaphor ===
Long-distance running gives the character an ability to escape from society without the pressures of a team, which may be found in other athletic stories. Additionally, Sillitoe gave running a political perspective that changed the vision of a literary runner. Sillitoe's character Smith uses running as a way to mentally reflect, allowing Smith to give clarity to his political insights and share them with the reader. Through running, Smith begins to understand and become aware of the class divisions in Britain.

During the period that Sillitoe wrote "The Loneliness of the Long Distance Runner" the idea of the runner was changing dramatically. Helen Small states, "...the weight of literary attention seems to be focused on a 'pre-professional era'—either written at that time or looking back at it for inspiration".

=== The "Angry Young Men" and Sillitoe ===
Many critics and colleagues of Alan Sillitoe regard him as a member of the "Angry Young Men" movement, though Sillitoe himself disliked the label. It was associated with writers who created "belligerent and opinionated" characters, and "The Loneliness of the Long Distance Runner" suggests a confrontation with the class issues of the time. Smith says "in the end the governor is going to be doomed while blokes like me will take the pickings of his roasted bones and dance like maniacs around his Borstal's ruins". It has been suggested that Sillitoe was never simply an "Angry Young Man" but had a deep and abiding hatred for the British class system, and that his and Smith's views were not very different.

== Adaptations ==
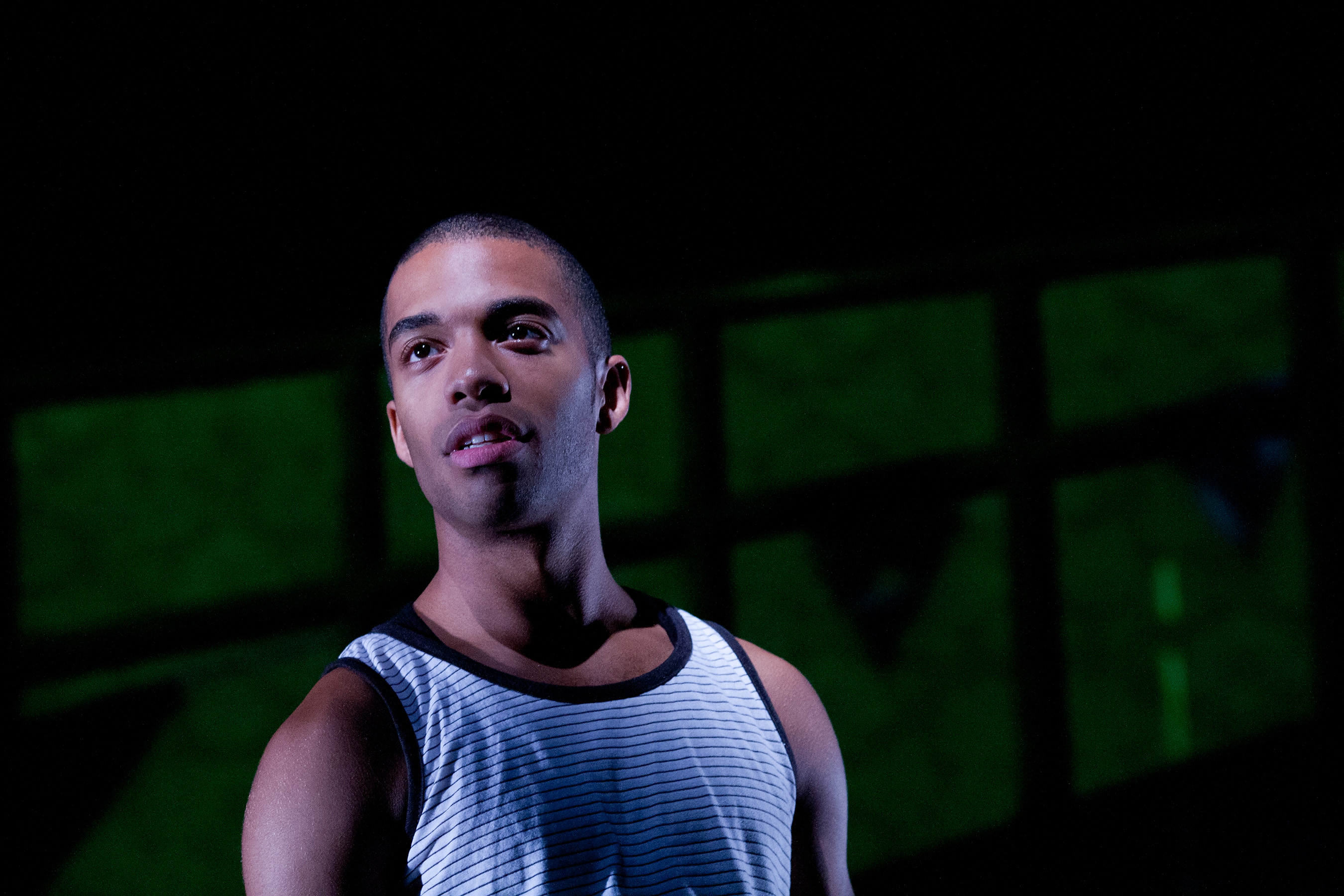
Elliot Barnes-Worrell as Colin Smith in the UK stage adaptation of The Loneliness of the Long Distance Runner (2012).

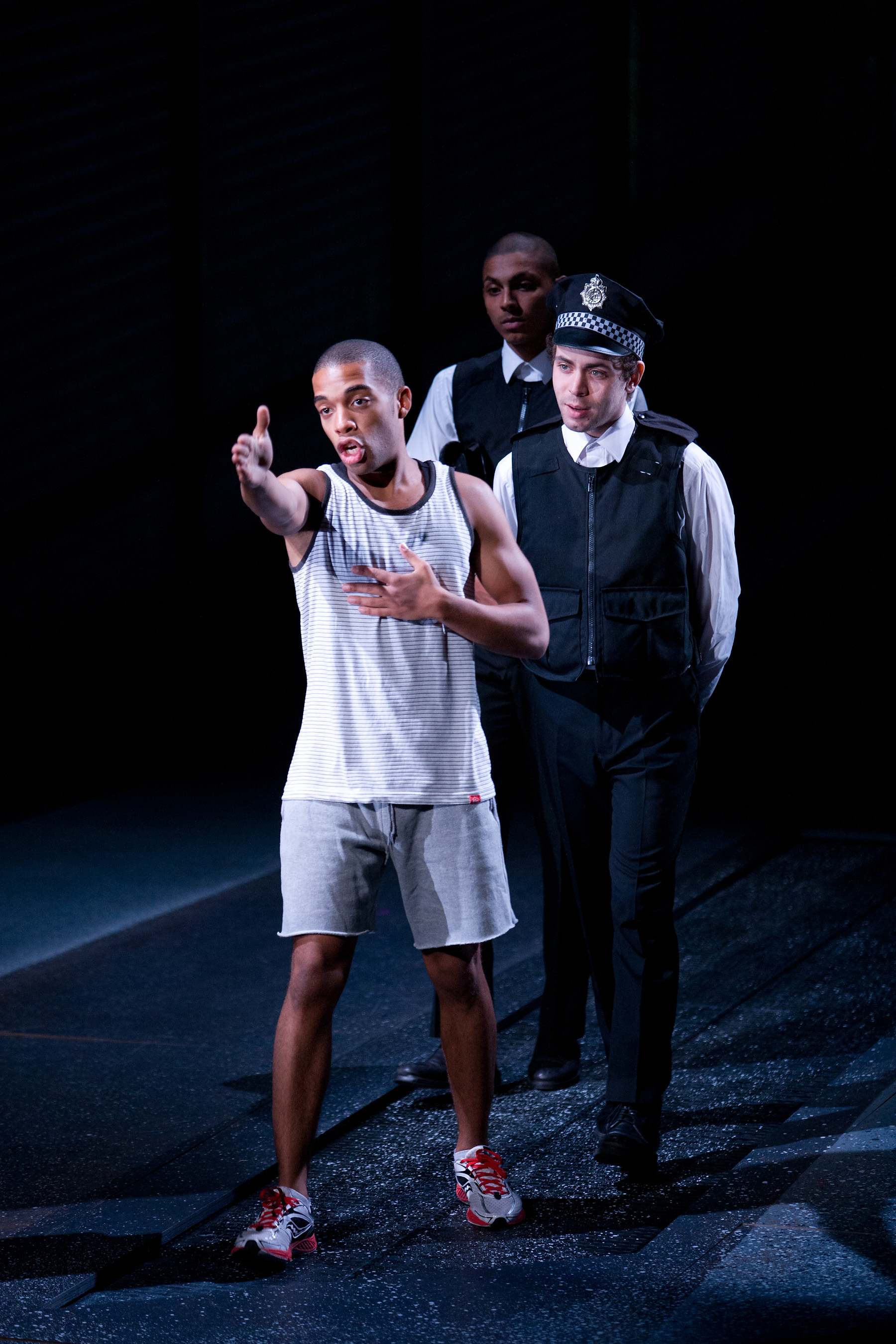
Barnes-Worrell with fellow cast members Curtis Cole and Sean Sagar (as two police officers).

The story was adapted for a 1962 film of the same title. A stage adaptation of the story, written by Roy Williams, was staged at York Theatre Royal in the UK in 2012, produced by Pilot Theatre Company. In this adaptation, Colin Smith was portrayed by Elliot Barnes-Worrell. Other notable cast members included Sean Sagar and Jack McMullen. The production also toured across the UK in the same year. The play was then picked up by the Off-Broadway Atlantic Theater in 2014. The New York production starred Sheldon Best as Colin Smith; other cast members included Zainab Jah, Jasmine Cephas Jones, Patrick Murney, Raviv Ullman, and Malik Yoba.

== References in culture ==
=== Music ===
- Bob Kaufman picks up on "The Loneliness of the Long Distance Runner" as a thematic metaphor in his prose poem, "Oct. 5th, 1963," collected in his 1967 City Lights paperback, Golden Sardine (and now in his Collected Poems, also from City Lights, 2019 p. 119–120).
- In 1986, the American jazz saxophone player David Liebman composed a whole suite on his album "The loneliness of a long distance runner" inspired by Alan Silitoe book
- The British heavy metal group Iron Maiden adapted the short story into the song of the same name on their Somewhere in Time album.
- British Oi! and punk band the Angelic Upstarts included a song of the same name on their Reason Why? album.
- Scottish indie group Belle and Sebastian adapted the title for the song "Loneliness of a Middle Distance Runner," a B-side on their 2001 single "Jonathan David" which also appears on the critically acclaimed compilation Push Barman to Open Old Wounds.
- Grindcore band Agoraphobic Nosebleed parodied the title with "The Loneliness of the Long Distance Drug Runner" from their album Agorapocalypse.
- Leeds anarchist pop band Chumbawamba samples audio from the film heavily in the song "Alright Now" on the unreleased album Jesus H. Christ.
- The American post-hardcore band Fugazi adapted the title for the song "Long Distance Runner" from their album Red Medicine.
- The Psychobilly band the Meteors reference the title in the name of the song "The Loneliness of the Long Distance Killer" on their These Evil Things album.
- Canadian rapper Buck 65 references the title in the song "Blood of a Young Wolf" with the lyrics "Lonely like the tight rope walker, hitchhiker, long distance runner."
- Charlottesville, Virginia (US) band September '67 performed "Loneliness of the Long Distance Runner" for Lilith Fair 1997
- Hardcore punk band This Routine is Hell entitled a song on their 2012 EP Repent. Repeat. "The Loneliness of the Long Distance Runner".
- British rock band Foals included the title of the book in their song "The Runner", a lead single from their 2019 album Everything Not Saved Will Be Lost – Part 2.
- Spanish rap group Los Chikos del Maíz named a single after the title of the book in 2016.
- A frame from the film was used on the cover of Velvet Rye's single "Isolated Nation".
- American hardcore punk band Modern Life Is War reference the book in the song "Young Man Blues" on their 2005 album, Witness.

=== Television ===
- Series 2 of the BBC sitcom Dad's Army included an episode titled "The Loneliness of the Long Distance Walker", the title being a play on words between the book and the Dad's Army character Private Walker.

=== Politics ===
- On 9 January 2009, impeached Illinois Gov. Rod Blagojevich referred to the story: "Let me simply say, I feel like the old Alan Sillitoe short story 'The Loneliness of the Long Distance Runner'... and that's what this is, by the way, a long-distance run."

=== Literature ===
- Garry Wills, in his 1969 book Nixon Agonistes, begins with a chapter entitled "The Loneliness of the Long-Distance Runner", which draws implicit parallels between the protagonist of the short story and former United States President Richard Nixon.
- Steve Wozniak, co-founder of Apple Inc., mentions in his book iWoz that The Loneliness of the Long-Distance Runner influenced his thinking.
- Adrian Tomine wrote a graphic novel called The Loneliness of the Long-Distance Cartoonist about the isolation he feels as a consequence of his solitary profession.
- BBC Digital's Time Trips series of Doctor Who ebooks included the 2014 short story "The Loneliness of the Long-Distance Time Traveller" by Joanne Harris.
