= Chodovlice =

- Municipality
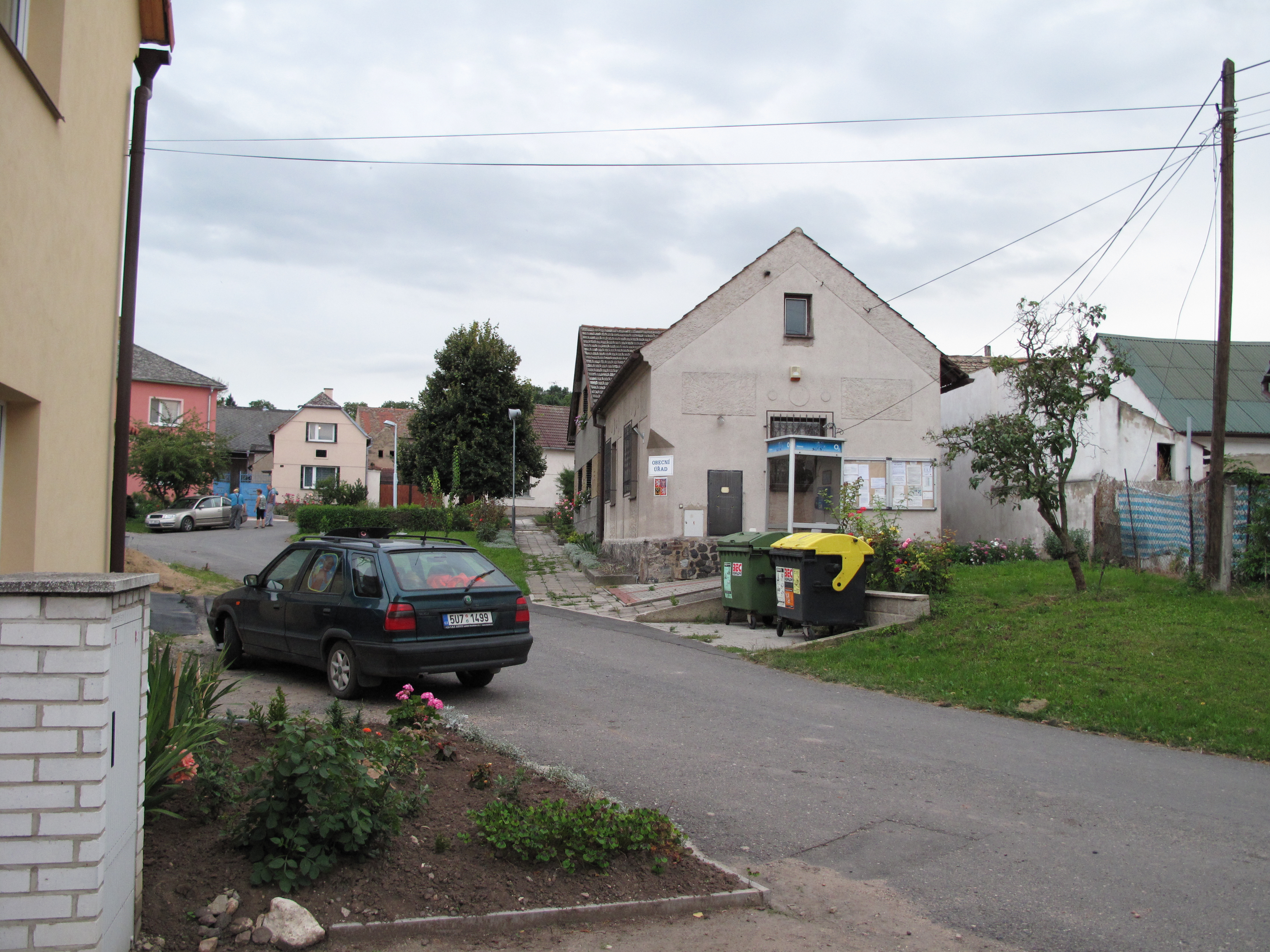
- Municipal office

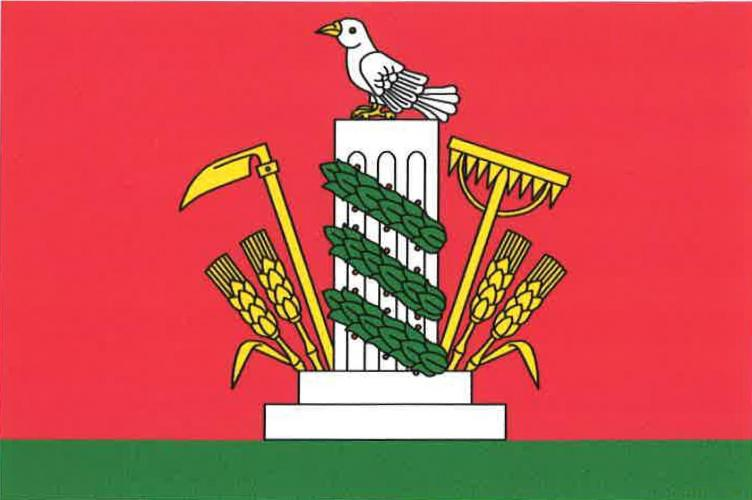
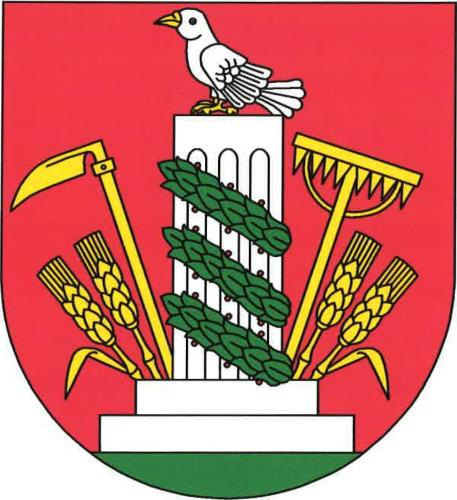
- Flag Coat of arms

- Location in the Czech Republic
- Coordinates: 50°27′47″N 13°59′46″E
- Country: Czech Republic
- Region: Ústí nad Labem
- District: Litoměřice
- First mentioned: 1227

Area
  - Total: 3.08 km^{2} (1.19 sq mi)
- Elevation: 200 m (660 ft)

Population (2026-01-01)
  - Total: 162
  - Density: 52.6/km^{2} (136/sq mi)
- Time zone: UTC+1 (CET)
  - Summer (DST): UTC+2 (CEST)
- Postal code: 411 15
- Website: www.chodovlice.cz

Chodovlice is a municipality and village in Litoměřice District in the Ústí nad Labem Region of the Czech Republic. It has about 200 inhabitants.

Chodovlice lies approximately 13 kilometres (8 mi) south-west of Litoměřice, 23 km (14 mi) south of Ústí nad Labem, and 51 km (32 mi) north-west of Prague.

== Demographics ==
Historical population
Year	Pop.	±%
1869	274	—
1880	301	+9.9%
1890	329	+9.3%
1900	348	+5.8%
1910	384	+10.3%
1921	355	−7.6%
1930	377	+6.2%
1950	262	−30.5%
1961	223	−14.9%
1970	207	−7.2%
1980	189	−8.7%
1991	155	−18.0%
2001	134	−13.5%
2011	144	+7.5%
2021	151	+4.9%
Source: Censuses
