= Richard Irving (director) =

American actor, director and producer

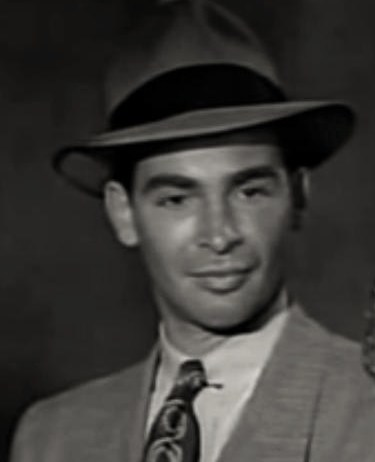
- Irving in Borderline, 1950
- Born: Irving Israel; February 13, 1917; New York, U.S.
- Died: December 23, 1990 (aged 73); San Diego, California, U.S.
- Occupations: Actor, director, producer
- Spouse: Joanne Irving
- Children: 2

Richard Irving (born Irving Israel, February 13, 1917 – December 23, 1990) was an American actor, director and producer. He was nominated for three Primetime Emmy Awards in the categories Outstanding Drama Series and Outstanding Television Movie for his work on the television programs The Name of the Game and Quincy, M.E..

Irving died on December 23, 1990 following heart surgery in hospital at San Diego, California, at the age of 73. He was buried in Hillside Memorial Park Cemetery.
