= Alan Sillitoe =

English writer (1928–2010)

Alan Sillitoe FRSL
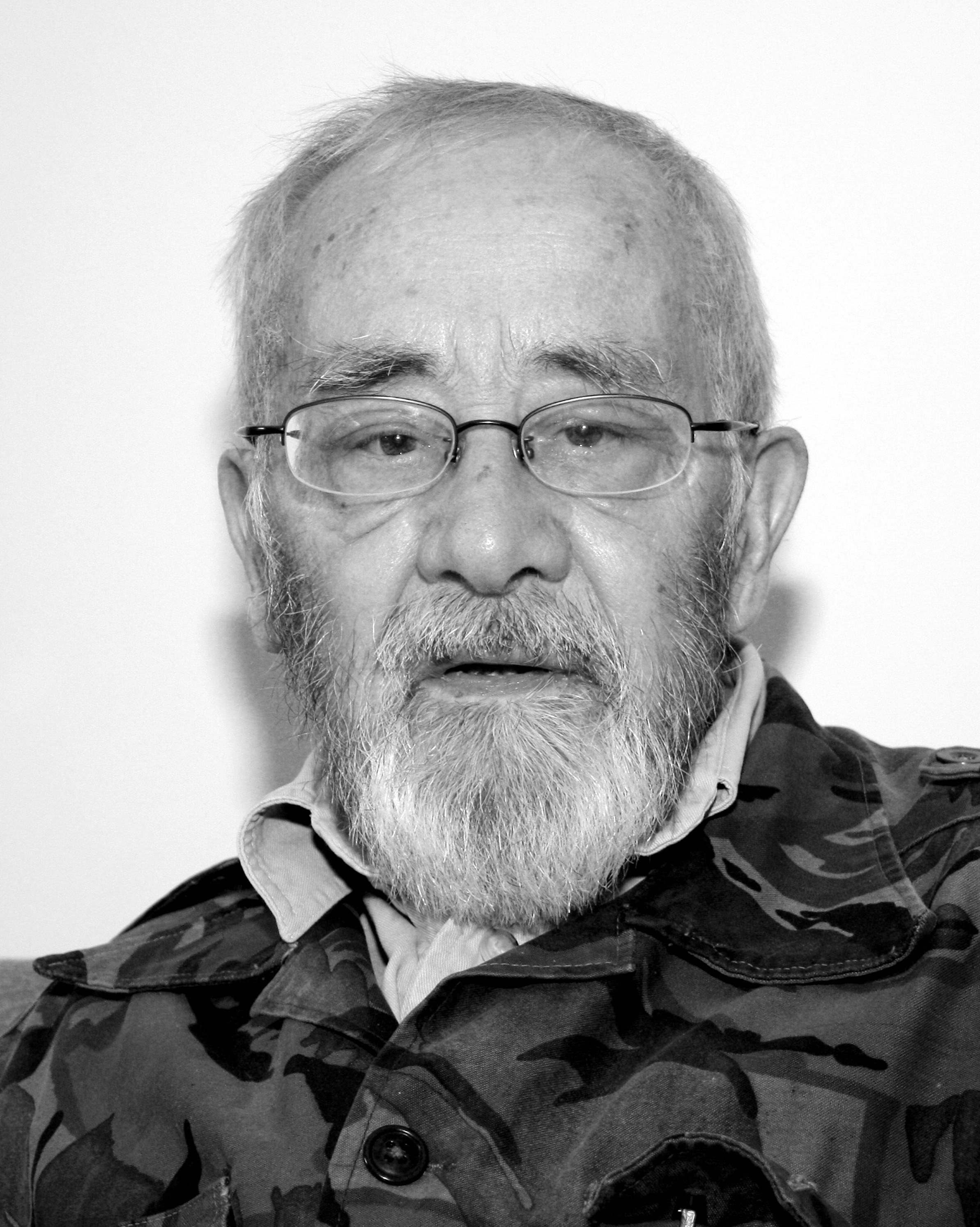
- Sillitoe in May 2009
- Born: 4 March 1928; Nottingham, England
- Died: 25 April 2010 (aged 82); London, England
- Occupation: Writer
- Spouse: Ruth Fainlight
- Writing career
- Notable works: Saturday Night and Sunday Morning (1958); "The Loneliness of the Long Distance Runner" (1959)

Alan Sillitoe FRSL (4 March 1928 – 25 April 2010) was an English writer and one of the so-called "angry young men" of the 1950s. He disliked the label, as did most of the other writers to whom it was applied. He is best known for his debut novel Saturday Night and Sunday Morning and his early short story "The Loneliness of the Long Distance Runner", both of which were adapted into films.

== Biography ==
Sillitoe was born in Nottingham to working-class parents, Christopher Sillitoe and Sabina (née Burton). Like Arthur Seaton, the anti-hero of his first novel, Saturday Night and Sunday Morning, his father worked at the Raleigh Bicycle Company's factory in the town. His father was illiterate, violent, and unsteady with his jobs, and the family was often on the brink of starvation.

Sillitoe left school at the age of 14, having failed the entrance examination to grammar school. He worked at the Raleigh factory for the next four years, spending his free time reading prodigiously and being a "serial lover of local girls". He joined the Air Training Corps in 1942, then the Royal Air Force (RAF), albeit too late to serve in the Second World War. He served as a wireless operator in Malaya during the Emergency. After returning to Britain, he was planning to enlist in the Royal Canadian Air Force when it was discovered that he had tuberculosis. He spent 16 months in an RAF hospital.

Pensioned off at the age of 21 on 45 shillings (£2.25) a week, he lived in France and Spain for seven years in an attempt to recover. In 1955, while living in Mallorca with the American poet Ruth Fainlight, whom he married in 1959, and in contact with the poet Robert Graves, Sillitoe started work on Saturday Night and Sunday Morning, which was published in 1958. Influenced in part by the stripped-down prose of Ernest Hemingway, the book conveys the attitudes and situation of a young factory worker faced with the inevitable end of his youthful philandering. As with John Osborne's Look Back in Anger (1956) and John Braine's Room at the Top (1957), the novel's real subject was the disillusionment of post-war Britain and the lack of opportunities for the working class. Saturday Night and Sunday Morning was adapted as a film with the same name by Karel Reisz in 1960, with Albert Finney as Arthur Seaton; the screenplay was written by Sillitoe.

Sillitoe's story The Loneliness of the Long Distance Runner, which concerns the rebellion of a borstal boy with a talent for running, won the Hawthornden Prize in 1959. It was also adapted into a film, in 1962, directed by Tony Richardson and starring Tom Courtenay. Sillitoe again wrote the screenplay.

With Fainlight he had a child, David. They later adopted another, Susan. Sillitoe lived at various times in Kent, London and Montpellier. In London he was friendly with the bookseller Bernard Stone (who had been born in Nottingham a few years before Sillitoe) and became one of the bohemian crowd that congregated at Stone's Turret Bookshop on Kensington Church Walk.

In the 1960s Sillitoe was celebrated in the Soviet Union as a spokesman for the "oppressed worker" in the West. Invited to tour the country, he visited several times in the 1960s and in 1968 he was asked to address the Congress of Soviet Writers' Unions, where he denounced Soviet human rights abuses, many of which he had witnessed.

In 1990 Sillitoe was awarded an honorary degree by Nottingham Polytechnic, now Nottingham Trent University. The city's older Russell Group university, the University of Nottingham, also awarded him an honorary D.Litt. in 1994. In 2006 his best-known play was staged at the university's Lakeside Arts theatre in an in-house production.

Sillitoe wrote many novels and several volumes of poems. His autobiography, Life Without Armour, which was critically acclaimed on publication in 1995, offers a view of his squalid childhood. In an interview Sillitoe claimed that "A writer, if he manages to earn a living at what he's doing, even if it's a very poor living, acquires some of the attributes of the old-fashioned gentleman (if I can be so silly)."

Gadfly in Russia, an account of his travels in Russia spanning 40 years, was published in 2007. In 2008, London Books republished A Start in Life in its London Classics series to mark the author's 80th birthday. Sillitoe appeared on Desert Island Discs on BBC Radio 4 on 25 January 2009.

Sillitoe's long-held desire for Saturday Night and Sunday Morning to be remade for a contemporary filmgoing audience was never achieved, despite strong efforts. Danny Brocklehurst was to adapt the book and Sillitoe gave his blessing to the project, but Tony Richardson's estate and Woodfall Films prevented it from going ahead.

Sillitoe was elected a Fellow of the Royal Society of Literature in 1997.

== Death ==
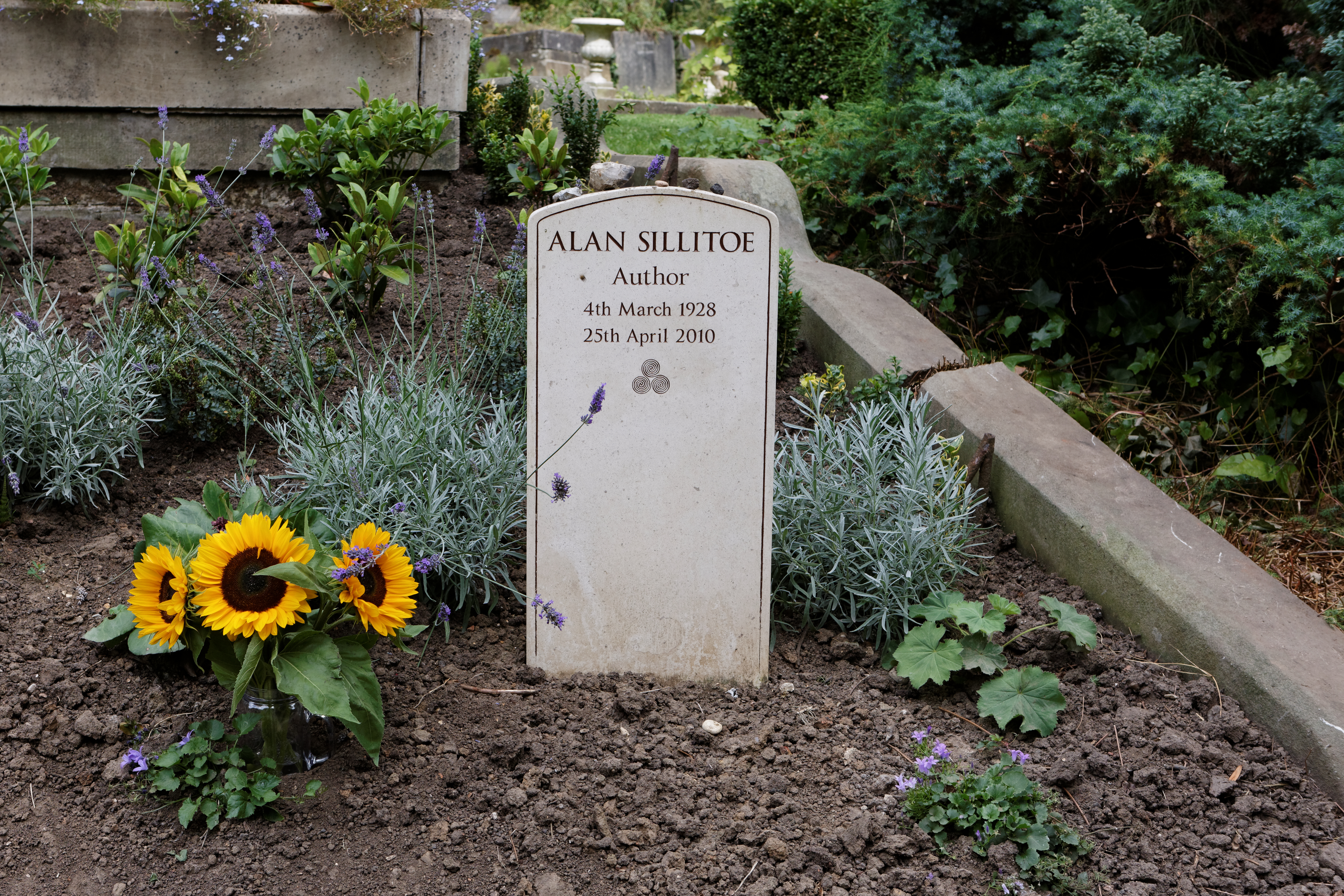
Sillitoe's grave in Highgate Cemetery

Sillitoe died of cancer on 25 April 2010 at Charing Cross Hospital in London. He was 82. He is buried in Highgate Cemetery.

== Works ==
=== Novels ===
- Saturday Night and Sunday Morning, London: Allen, 1958; New York: Knopf, 1959
  1968 Longman reissue has a new Sillitoe introduction, and commentary and notes by David Craig. 1976 Longman reprint adds Nottingham photographs and stills from the film.
- The General, London: Allen, 1960; New York: Knopf, 1961
- Key to the Door, London: Allen, 1961; New York: Knopf, 1962
  Reissued with a new preface by Sillitoe, London: Allen, 1978.
- The Death of William Posters, London: Allen, 1965; New York: Knopf, 1965
- A Tree on Fire, London: Macmillan, 1967; Garden City, NY: Doubleday, 1968
- A Start in Life, London: Allen, 1970; New York: Scribners, 1971 – first part of Michael Cullen trilogy
- Travels in Nihilon, London: Allen, 1971; New York: Scribners, 1972
- The Flame of Life, London: Allen, 1974
- The Widower's Son, Allen, 1976; New York: Harper & Row, 1977
- The Storyteller, London: Allen, 1979; New York: Simon & Schuster, 1980.
- Her Victory, London: Granada, 1982; New York: Watts, 1982
- The Lost Flying Boat, London: Granada, 1983; Boston: Little, Brown, 1983
- Down from the Hill, London: Granada, 1984
- Life Goes On, London: Granada, 1985 – second part of Michael Cullen trilogy
- Out of the Whirlpool. London: Hutchinson, 1987
- The Open Door, London: Grafton/Collins, 1989
- Last Loves, London: Grafton, 1990; Boston: Chivers, 1991
- Leonard's War: A Love Story. London: HarperCollins, 1991
- Snowstop, London: HarperCollins, 1993
- The Broken Chariot, London: Flamingo/HarperCollins, 1998
- The German Numbers Woman, London: Flamingo/HarperCollins, 1999
- Birthday, London: Flamingo/HarperCollins, 2001
- A Man of His Time, London: Flamingo, 2004; New York: Harper Perennial, 2005
- Moggerhanger, New York: Seven Stories, 2016.
  Published posthumously; third part of Michael Cullen trilogy

=== Short story collections ===
==== Original collections ====
- The Loneliness of the Long Distance Runner, London: Allen, 1959; New York: Knopf, 1960
- The Ragman’s Daughter and Other Stories, London: Allen, 1963; New York: Knopf, 1964
- Guzman, Go Home and Other Stories, London: Macmillan, 1968; Garden City, NY: Doubleday, 1969
  Reissued with a new preface by Sillitoe, London: Allen, 1979.
- Men, Women and Children, London: Allen, 1973; New York: Scribners, 1974
- The Second Chance and Other Stories, London: Cape, 1981; New York: Simon & Schuster, 1981
- Alligator Playground: A Collection of Short Stories, London: Flamingo, 1997

==== Regroupings ====
- A Sillitoe Selection: Eight Short Stories, Harlow: Longmans, 1968
  Previously collected stories with an introduction by Sillitoe and study aids.
- The Far Side of the Street: Fifteen Short Stories, London: Allen, 1988
  Previously collected stories chosen by Sillitoe, who also provides an introduction.
- Collected Stories, London: Flamingo, 1995; New York: HarperCollins, 1996
  Thirty-eight of the forty-three stories from the first five collections.
- New and Collected Stories, London: Robson, 2003; New York: Carroll & Graf, 2005
  An unaltered reprint of the Collected Stories with three previously uncollected stories added at the end.

=== Compilations ===
- Down to the Bone, Exeter: Wheaton, 1976
- Every Day of the Week: An Alan Sillitoe Reader, with an introduction by John Sawkins, London: Allen, 1987

=== Writing for children ===
- The City Adventures of Marmalade Jim, London: Macmillan, 1967; Toronto: Macmillan, 1967; revised ed., London: Robson, 1977
- Big John and the Stars, London: Robson, 1977
- The Incredible Fencing Fleas, London: Robson, 1978. Illus. Mike Wilks.
- Marmalade Jim at the Farm, London: Robson, 1980
- Marmalade Jim and the Fox, London: Robson, 1984

=== Essays and travel writings ===
- Road to Volgograd, London: Allen, 1964; New York: Knopf, 1964
- Raw Material, London: Allen, 1972; New York: Scribners, 1973; rev. ed., London: Pan Books, 1974; further revised, London: Star Books, 1978; further revised, London: Allen, 1979
- Mountains and Caverns: Selected Essays, London: Allen, 1975
- Words Broadsheet Nineteen, by Sillitoe and Ruth Fainlight. Bramley, Surrey: Words Press, 1975. Broadside
- "The Interview", London: The 35s (Women's Campaign for Soviet Jewry), 1976
- Israel: Poems on a Hebrew Theme, with drawings by Ralph Steadman; London: Steam Press, 1981 98 copies.
- The Saxon Shore Way: From Gravesend to Rye, by Sillitoe and Fay Godwin. London: Hutchinson, 1983
- Alan Sillitoe’s Nottinghamshire, with photographs by David Sillitoe. London: Grafton, 1987
- Shylock the Writer, London: Turret Bookshop, 1991
- The Mentality of the Picaresque Hero, London: Turret Bookshop, 1993, Turret Papers, no. 2. (500 copies)
- Leading the Blind: A Century of Guidebook Travel. 1815-1914, London: Macmillan, 1995
- Gadfly in Russia, JR Books, 2007

=== Plays ===
- Three Plays, London: Allen, 1978
  Contains The Slot-Machine, The Interview, Pit Strike.

=== Autobiography ===
- Life Without Armour, London: HarperCollins, 1995

=== Collections of poems ===
- Without Beer or Bread, Dulwich Village: Outposts, 1957
- The Rats and Other Poems, London: Allen, 1960
- Falling Out of Love and Other Poems, London; Allen, 1964; Garden City, NY: Doubleday, 1964
- Shaman and Other Poems", Turret, 1968 (Limited ed. of 500 copies, 100 copies signed and numbered)
- Love in the Environs of Voronezh and Other Poems, London: Macmillan, 1968; Garden City, NY: Doubleday, 1969.
- Poems, by Sillitoe, Ruth Fainlight and Ted Hughes; London: Rainbow Press, 1971. (300 copies)
- From Canto Two of The Rats, Wittersham, Kent: Alan Sillitoe, 1973
- Barbarians and Other Poems, London: Turret Books, 1973. 500 copies
- Storm: New Poems, London: Allen, 1974
- Somme, London: Steam Press, 1974. In Steam Press Portfolio, no. 2. 50 copies
- Day-Dream Communiqué, Knotting, Bedfordshire: Sceptre Press, 1977. 150 copies
- From Snow on the North Side of Lucifer, Knotting, Bedfordshire: Sceptre Press, 1979. (150 copies)
- Snow on the North Side of Lucifer: Poems, London: Allen, 1979
- Poems for Shakespeare 7, Bear Gardens Museum and Arts Centre, 1979 (Limited to 500 numbered copies)
- More Lucifer, Knotting, Bedfordshire: Martin Booth, 1980. 125 copies
- Sun Before Departure: Poems, 1974–1982, London: Granada, 1984
- Tides and Stone Walls: Poems, with photographs by Victor Bowley; London: Grafton, 1986
- Three Poems, Child Okefurd, Dorset: Words Press, 1988. 200 copies
- Collected Poems, London: HarperCollins, 1993

=== Film scripts ===
- Saturday Night and Sunday Morning (1960) — based on his novel
- The Loneliness of the Long Distance Runner (1962) — based on his short story
- Counterpoint (1967) — based on his novel The General
- The Ragman's Daughter (1972) — based on his short story

=== Translations ===
- Chopin's Winter in Majorca 1838–1839, by Luis Ripoll, translated by Sillitoe. Palma de Majorca: Mossen Alcover, 1955
- Chopin’s Pianos: The Pleyel in Majorca, by Luis Ripoll, translated by Sillitoe. Palma de Majorca: Mossen Alcover, 1958
- All Citizens Are Soldiers (Fuente Ovejuna): A Play in Two Acts, by Lope de Vega, translated by Sillitoe and Ruth Fainlight. London: Macmillan, 1969; Chester Springs, PA: Dufour, 1969
- Poems for Shakespeare, volume 7, edited and translated by Sillitoe and Ruth Fainlight. London: Bear Gardens Museum & Arts Centre, 1980

== Sources ==
- Reuters
