= W. H. Allen & Co. =

British publishing company

- Founded: 1835; 191 years ago
- Founder: William Houghton Allen
- Defunct: 1991
- Successor: Virgin Books
- Country of origin: United Kingdom
- Headquarters location: London
- Publication types: Books
- Nonfiction topics: Nonfiction
- Fiction genres: Science fiction
- Imprints: Target Books
- Owner: Ebury Publishing

William H. Allen and Company (est. 1835) was a bookselling and publishing business in London, England, at first known for issuing works related to the British colonies. It operated from headquarters in Leadenhall Street, later moving to Waterloo Place. Early owners and staff included James P. Allen, William Ferneley Allen (d. 1877), and William Houghton Allen.

After a series of acquisitions, in 1991 W. H. Allen was renamed Virgin Publishing Ltd.

== History ==
By 1975 W. H. Allen was part of the British conglomerate Howard & Wyndham Ltd. During 1977 and 1978 the Wyndham identity was phased out, with the whole publishing line being identified with the W. H. Allen brand. The Target Books paperback line became well known for its highly successful range of novelisations and other assorted books based on the popular science fiction television series Doctor Who.

In 1977, W. H. Allen acquired Warner Communications' publishing division, including Williams Publishing and Thorpe & Porter; but by 1978–1979 W. H. Allen decided to close down both divisions.

W. H. Allen was acquired by Virgin Books in a process that spanned late 1986 to late 1987. Virgin Books was incorporated into W. H. Allen in 1989, but in 1991 W. H. Allen was renamed Virgin Publishing Ltd. Random House, through its United Kingdom division, acquired a 90% stake in Virgin Books in March 2007. In November 2009, Virgin became an independent imprint within Ebury Publishing, a division of the Random House Group.

== Book series ==
- All About Series for Children
- Allen's Naturalist's Library
- The Book of the Film Series
- British Trade Union History Collection
- Comet Book
- Eminent Women Series
- Falconhurst Series
- The History of India as Told by Its Own Historians
- Hurricane Books
- The Illustrated History of the Movies
- Lensman Series
- Made Simple Books
- NARC Series
- Sensual World (autobiographical series by Rupert Croft-Cooke)
- Splendour Books
- Star Books
- Statesmen Series
- Target Books
- Theatre Review
- This Is... - series of children's travel books illustrated by Miroslav Šašek
- Worth-While War-Time Books

== Predecessors ==
- Black, Kingsbury, and Parbury
- Black, Kingsbury, Parbury and Allen, 1818–1822
- Kingsbury, Parbury, and Allen, 1822–1827 (William Houghton Allen, Thomas Kingsbury, Charles Parbury)
- Parbury, Allen, and Co., 1827–1834 (William Houghton Allen, Charles Parbury)
- Parbury and Allen

== See also ==
- George Parbury

== Bibliography ==
issued by the firm

- Asiatic Journal
  - The Asiatic Journal and Monthly Register for British and Foreign India, China, and Australasia. New Series. Vol. XXVI. Wm. H. Allen and Co. May–August 1838.
  - East India Company (1832). The Asiatic Journal and Monthly Miscellany, Volume 8. Wm. H. Allen & Company.
  - The Asiatic Journal and Monthly Miscellany, Volume 26. Wm. H. Allen & Company. 1838.
  - Asiatic Journal and Monthly Miscellany. Wm. H. Allen & Company. 1839.
  - The Asiatic journal and monthly register for British and foreign India, China and Australasia, Volume 29. Allen. 1839.
  - The Asiatic Journal and Monthly Miscellany, Volume 9. Wm. H. Allen & Company. 1882.
  - Asiatic Journal, Volume 9. Parbury, Allen, and Company. 1832.
- Catalogs
  - Catalogue of Books in Oriental Literature...Published or Imported by Wm. H. Allen and Co., Booksellers to the Honourable East-India Company. London. 1837.
- A grammar of the Hindūstānī or Urdū language
  - John Thompson Platts (1874). A grammar of the Hindūstānī or Urdū language. Vol. 6423 of Harvard College Library preservation microfilm program. LONDON: W.H. Allen. p. 399.Oxford University
  - John Thompson Platts (1892). A grammar of the Hindūstānī or Urdū language. LONDON: W.H. Allen. p. 399.the New York Public Library
- Dictionaries
  - Platts, John Thompson (1884). A dictionary of Urdu, classical Hindi, and English. London: W. H. Allen & Co. OCLC 1243728973.
