= The Third Eye Centre =

Compilation album by Belle and Sebastian
- Released: 26 August 2013
- Recorded: 2002–2010
- Genre: Indie pop
- Length: 68:43
- Label: Rough Trade
- Producers: Trevor Horn, Belle & Sebastian, Tony Doogan, Tony Hoffer, Darren Allison

Belle and Sebastian chronology
Write About Love (2010)	The Third Eye Centre (2013)	Girls in Peacetime Want to Dance (2015)

Professional ratings
Aggregate scores
Source	Rating
Metacritic	71/100
Review scores
Source	Rating
Consequence of Sound	3.5/5 stars
MusicOMH	3/5 stars
Tom Hull	B

The Third Eye Centre is the second compilation album by Belle and Sebastian, released on 26 August 2013. It assembles various B-Sides and rarities the band has released since its previous compilation album Push Barman to Open Old Wounds.

== Track listing ==
No.	Title	Original Release	Length
1.	"I'm a Cuckoo" (Avalanches Remix)	"I'm a Cuckoo" single	3:59
2.	"Suicide Girl"	Belle and Sebastian Write About Love bonus track	2:40
3.	"Love on the March"	"Step into My Office, Baby" single	3:50
4.	"Last Trip"	Belle and Sebastian Write About Love bonus track	3:02
5.	"Your Secrets"	Books EP	3:12
6.	"Your Cover's Blown" (Miaoux Miaoux Remix)	Not previously released, original found on Books	5:58
7.	"I Took a Long Hard Look"	"Funny Little Frog" single	3:34
8.	"Heaven in the Afternoon"	"White Collar Boy" single	3:30
9.	"Long Black Scarf"	"White Collar Boy" single	2:51
10.	"The Eighth Station of the Cross Kebab House"	War Child's Help!: A Day in the Life album	3:58
11.	"I Didn't See It Coming" (Richard X Mix)	Come on Sister EP	3:46
12.	"(I Believe in) Travellin' Light"	"I'm a Cuckoo" single	2:38
13.	"Stop, Look and Listen"	"I'm a Cuckoo" single	4:07
14.	"Passion Fruit" (Previously part of "Stop, Look and Listen")	"I'm a Cuckoo" single	2:34
15.	"Desperation Made a Fool of Me"	"Step into My Office, Baby" single	4:16
16.	"Blue Eyes of a Millionaire"	Belle and Sebastian Write About Love bonus track	3:41
17.	"Mr. Richard"	"The Blues Are Still Blue" single	2:36
18.	"Meat and Potatoes"	"Funny Little Frog" single	4:29
19.	"The Life Pursuit"	"The Blues Are Still Blue" single	4:39

=== Excluded tracks ===
There are various tracks that didn't make the track listing, despite being released since Push Barman to Open Old Wounds. They include:

- "Your Cover's Blown" (non-remixed, from the "Books" EP)
- "Baby Jane" (Rod Stewart cover, from the 7" Vinyl version of "White Collar Boy")
- "Final Day" (Young Marble Giants cover, from the Stop Me If You Think You've Heard This One Before ... compilation)
- "Final Day" - slow version (Young Marble Giants cover, from the Japanese "Books" EP')
- "Whiskey in the Jar" (traditional Irish cover from "The Blues Are Still Blue" 7" vinyl single)
- "I'm a Cuckoo (Japanese version)" (from the Japanese "Books" EP')
- "Cassaco Marron" (from the Late Night Tales: Belle & Sebastian compilation)
- "Crash" (The Primitives cover, from the Late Night Tales: Belle & Sebastian Vol. II compilation)
- "Come on Sister (Tony Doogan mix)" (from the "Come On Sister" 12" vinyl)
- "I Didn't See It Coming (Cold Cave mix)" (from the "Come On Sister" 12" vinyl)
- "Are You Coming Over For Christmas?" (from the Christmas single, 2007)
- "The Monkeys are Breaking Out the Zoo" (from Colours are Brighter compilation)
- "Cover (Version)" (from the "Books" EP)

== Charts ==
Chart (2013)	Peak position
Spanish Albums (Promusicae)	90
US Billboard 200	145
