= White Collar Boy =

2006 single by Belle & Sebastian

Single by Belle & Sebastian

from the album The Life Pursuit
- Released: 26 June 2006
- Length: 3:20
- Label: Rough Trade
- Songwriters: Richard Colburn, Mick Cooke, Chris Geddes, Stevie Jackson, Sarah Martin (musician), Stuart Murdoch, Bobby Kildea
- Producer: Tony Hoffer

Belle & Sebastian singles chronology
"The Blues Are Still Blue" (2006)	"White Collar Boy" (2006)	"Write About Love" (2010)

"White Collar Boy" (as shown on the album or "The White Collar Boy" as labeled on the single) is a song by Belle & Sebastian from their album The Life Pursuit. It was the third single from the album. The track was released on 26 June 2006 on Rough Trade Records, and was produced by Tony Hoffer. Upon release, it failed to reach the top 40 on the UK Singles Chart, stalling at number 45. It was the band's first single not to make the Top 40 since "Lazy Line Painter Jane". The model on the cover is Catherine Ireton, who later became the lead vocalist for Stuart Murdoch's God Help the Girl project.

== Track listings ==
All songs were written by Belle & Sebastian except where noted.

CD

1. "White Collar Boy" – 3:22
2. "Long Black Scarf" – 2:48
3. "Heaven in the Afternoon" – 3:29

7-inch vinyl

1. "White Collar Boy" – 3:20
2. "Baby Jane" (Rod Stewart) – 2:50

DVD

1. "White Collar Boy" (video)
2. "Sukie In The Graveyard" (live)
