= Late Night Tales: Belle & Sebastian =

Compilation album by Belle & Sebastian
- Released: 27 February 2006
- Genre: Chamber pop
- Length: 1:14:34
- Label: Azuli
- Producer: Belle & Sebastian

Belle & Sebastian chronology
The Life Pursuit (2006)	Late Night Tales: Belle & Sebastian (2006)	Introducing... Belle & Sebastian (2008)

Late Night Tales chronology
The Flaming Lips (2005)	Belle & Sebastian (2006)	Air (2006)

Professional ratings
Review scores
Source	Rating
Pitchfork Media	(6.8)

Late Night Tales: Belle & Sebastian is the 14th release in Late Night Tales series of DJ mix albums. It was compiled and mixed by Belle & Sebastian and was released on 27 February 2006.

== Track listing ==
1. "Gratuitous Theft in the Rain" - Rehash
2. "How Long Blues" - Jimmy and Mama Yancey
3. "Here's What's Left" - RJD2
4. "Questions" - Lootpack
5. "O My Friends You've Been Untrue to Me" - Demis Roussos
6. "French Disko" - Stereolab
7. "On a Clear Day You Can See Forever" - The Peddlers
8. "Cissy Strut" - The Butch Cassidy Sound System
9. "Ring of Fire" - Johnny Cash
10. "Free Man" - The Ethiopians
11. "Do You Really Want to Rescue Me" - Elsie Mae
12. "It's an Uphill Climb (To the Bottom)" - Walter Jackson
13. "I'm In Your Hands" - Mary Love
14. "Coś Specjalnego" - Novi Singers
15. "Lost in the Paradise" - Gal Costa
16. "People Make the World Go Round (Kenny Dixon Jr. Remix)" - Innerzone Orchestra
17. "Uhuru" - Ramsey Lewis
18. "Fly Like an Eagle" - Steve Miller Band
19. "Get Thy Bearings" - Donovan
20. "Green Grass of Tunnel" - múm
21. "Cassaco Marron" - Belle & Sebastian
22. "Taireva" - Zimbabwe Shona Mbira Music
23. "Let Your Conscience Be Your Guidance" - Space Jam
24. "Watch the Sunrise" - Big Star
25. "Badinerie from Bach's Orchestral Suite No.2 in B Minor" - Boston Baroque
26. "When I Was a Little Girl" - David Shrigley

== Follow-up ==
The group released the follow-up compilation, Late Night Tales: Belle and Sebastian Vol. II, in 2012.

== Casaco Marrom ==
"Casaco Marrom" (Portuguese: "Brown Coat"; misspelled "Casaco Marron" on the sleeve) is a limited-edition 7-inch single by the Scottish indie band Belle and Sebastian. 1000 copies were pressed and released by Azuli Records in 2006, one week before the release of Azuli's Late Night Tales: Belle & Sebastian compilation, on which both of the single's tracks were also included. The A-side is Belle & Sebastian's cover of a song by Evinha, of the Brazilian group Trio Esperança. The B-side is a spoken-word piece by David Shrigley called "When I Was a Little Girl," making the release technically a split single, although it was not promoted as such.

== Track listing ==
1. Belle & Sebastian – "Casaco Marrom" (Evinha)
2. David Shrigley – "When I Was a Little Girl" (Shrigley)
