= Late Night Tales: Belle and Sebastian Vol. II =

Compilation album by Belle & Sebastian
- Released: 26 March 2012
- Genre: Chamber pop
- Length: 1:19:08
- Label: Night Time Stories
- Producer: Belle & Sebastian

Belle & Sebastian chronology
Belle and Sebastian Write About Love (2010)	Late Night Tales: Belle and Sebastian Vol. II (2012)	Girls in Peacetime Want to Dance (2015)

Late Night Tales chronology
Late Night Tales: MGMT (2011)	Belle & Sebastian Vol. II (2012)	Late Night Tales: Music For Pleasure (2012)

Professional ratings
Review scores
Source	Rating
Pitchfork Media	7.0

Late Night Tales: Belle and Sebastian Vol. II is the 27th release in the Late Night Tales series of DJ mix albums, compiled and mixed by Scottish band Belle & Sebastian. Released on 26 March 2012, it was the group's second Tales compilation, following a 2006 release.

== Track listing ==
1. "Ominous Cloud" - Broadcast
2. "Watch the Flowers Grow" - The Wonder Who?
3. "A Time for Us" - Joe Pass
4. "Yekermo Sew (A Man of Experience and Wisdom)" - Mulatu Astatke
5. "Tudo Que Você Podia Ser" - Milton Nascimento & Lô Borges
6. "Et Si Je T'aime" - Marie Laforêt
7. "Bird of Space" - Bonnie Dobson
8. "Soul Vibrations" - Dorothy Ashby
9. "Tomorrow's People" - McDonald and Giles
10. "Quitters Raga" - Gold Panda
11. "Chord Simple" - Broadcast
12. "Savage Sea" - The Pop Group
13. "Starless and Bible Black" - Stan Tracey Quartet
14. "Darling Be Home Soon" - The Lovin' Spoonful
15. "Crash" - Belle & Sebastian
16. "L.S.D. Partie" - Roland Vincent
17. "Still Sound" - Toro Y Moi
18. "Rude Bwoy Thug Life" - Ce'Cile
19. "Scottish Widows" - Remember Remember
20. "Streets of Derry" - Trees
21. "Spinning Wheel" - Blood, Sweat & Tears
22. "Homosapien (Dub)" - Pete Shelley
23. "Still Thinking of You" - Steve Parks
24. "On the Other Ocean" - David Behrman
25. "Lost for Words Pt.3" - Paul Morley
