= Cover version (disambiguation) =

Cover version is a later version of a song already established with a different earlier performer.

It may also refer to:

- Cover Version, an album by Steven Wilson
- "Cover (Version)", a song by Belle and Sebastian
