= Shantha Roberts =

Shantha Roberts (born May 1982) is a former MTV presenter.

Born in Glasgow, and a Glasgow University graduate, she speaks fluent French and German and is a member of the band, Daddy and the Husband. Her face appeared on the cover of Belle & Sebastian's Dear Catastrophe Waitress and "I'm a Cuckoo" and appeared in their "I'm a Cuckoo" video. She also appeared in the video for "Keep Forgetting" by The Cinematics.

From November 2005 until its demise in late 2014, Roberts presented The Music Show on BBC Two Scotland Its last shows were broadcast in November 2014. after being discovered in a coffee shop. She has also worked as a vocalist with Glasgow reggae sound system Argonaut Sounds, recording cover versions of "Breakfast in Bed" and "On The Right Track", and providing backing vocals on Babascum's "Precious Queen".

She plays keyboards in the London indie rock band Anteloper.
