= Write About Love =

Write About Love may refer to:

- Belle and Sebastian Write About Love, known informally as Write about Love, an album by Belle and Sebastian, and the title song
- Write About Love (film), a 2019 Filipino romance film
