= God Help the Girl =

Studio album by God Help the Girl
- Released: 22 June 2009
- Studios: Angel Studios, Islington, London, England; Cava Sounds, Glasgow, Scotland
- Genres: Indie pop, chamber pop, girl group
- Length: 44:36
- Labels: Rough Trade, Matador

Professional ratings
Aggregate scores
Source	Rating
Metacritic	73/100
Review scores
Source	Rating
Allmusic	3/5 stars
Rockfeedback	4/5 stars
Pitchfork	(7.5/10)
PopMatters	8/10 stars
Stereokill	4/5 stars
The Guardian	4/5 stars
Mojo	4/5 stars
Uncut	4/5 stars
The Times	4/5 stars
Record Collector	4/5 stars

God Help the Girl is a 2009 album by Stuart Murdoch of the band Belle and Sebastian with female vocalists such as Catherine Ireton. God Help the Girl is also the name of the band and the accompanying film released in 2014. The songs are about an Australian girl who is hospitalized in Glasgow after a nervous breakdown. Two songs ("Funny Little Frog" and "Act of the Apostle") were taken from the repertory of Belle and Sebastian.

== Origin of the project ==
The author of the project God Help the Girl is Stuart Murdoch, lead singer of the Glasgow-based Scottish indie pop group Belle and Sebastian. In 2004, during a tour promoting their album Dear Catastrophe Waitress, he came up with the idea of writing a series of songs telling about the life of girls and young women which could be sung not by his group but female vocalists. Thinking about this project, he started writing new songs which were shelved for the time being; after some time the idea of arranging them in a logical whole and making a film occurred to him.

Looking for performers for his songs, Murdoch placed an advertisement in a local magazine in Glasgow in 2004. The first vocalists who joined the project were Celia García from Edinburgh, Scotland, who responded to the advertisement placed in the magazine, and Alex Klobouk from Germany, who met Stuart Murdoch on the Dear Catastrophe Waitress tour. Stuart Murdoch also held an open audition on the imeem community portal – the candidates who wanted to work with the group were to send in their demos of two Belle and Sebastian songs: "Funny Little Frog" and "The Psychiatrist Is In". Brittany Stallings and Dina Bankole from the US were chosen out of about 400 applications; in February 2008 they were invited to a trial recording session in Glasgow. Eventually "Funny Little Frog" was sung in the project by Brittany Stallings, with Dina Bankole performing some of the other pieces.

In 2008 and 2009, some other vocalists joined the project, including Asya from the Seattle-based group Smoosh, Linnea Jönsson from the Swedish band Those Dancing Days; there was also one man in this group: Neil Hannon from The Divine Comedy.

== Work with Catherine Ireton ==
The main discovery of the project turned out to be Catherine Ireton, with whom Murdoch had established contact by chance in 2005. Catherine Ireton comes from Limerick in Ireland, she was studying Drama and Theatre Studies at University College Cork between 2002 and 2005. There she was the vocalist in the pop-jazz group elephant, with whom she published the album In the Moon in 2004. The band broke up in July 2005, but before that the songwriter and guitarist of elephant, Michael John McCarthy, moved to Glasgow to do a post-graduate course and passed the album In the Moon to his friend who showed it to Stuart Murdoch. When Stuart Murdoch heard the album of elephant, he invited Catherine Ireton, who was in her final year at university and both directed and played in theatre performances in Ireland at that time, to Glasgow in March 2005, held a trial recording session for her and afterwards asked her if she wanted to work with Belle and Sebastian. The singer agreed and moved to Scotland in the same year. She joined the project along with other vocalists, singing and recording demos of nearly all the songs.

Catherine Ireton appeared on the sleeve of the EP The White Collar Boy as early as 2006 even though she did not perform any songs on it. Finally she appeared as the vocalist in the single "Come Monday Night" and then in the main album God Help the Girl, both released in 2009. Out of 14 pieces on the album, Catherine Ireton performs (solo or with other singers) in 10 songs.

== Film ==
The film of the same name was shot in Glasgow during 2012 and released in 2014. It was premiered at the Sundance Film Festival in January 2014 in the World Cinema Dramatic section, and a European premiere was held on the Berlin International Film Festival in February.

The film was awarded a special jury prize at the Sundance Film Festival in January 2014.

== Musical releases ==
The records released within the project include so far three singles, one EP (Stills) and the album God Help the Girl with the following pieces:

"Come Monday Night" – single, released on 11 May 2009:

1. "Come Monday Night" (Catherine Ireton)
2. "Howard Jones Is My Mozart" (Kim Moore)

God Help the Girl – the main album of the project, whose recording began in CaVa Studios in Glasgow and which was released on 22 June 2009:

1. "Act of the Apostle" (Catherine Ireton) – 2:43
2. "God Help The Girl" (Catherine Ireton) – 3:25
3. "Pretty Eve in the Tub" (Stuart Murdoch and Catherine Ireton) – 2:46
4. "A Unified Theory" (instrumental) – 1:15
5. "Hiding Neath My Umbrella" (Catherine Ireton and Stuart Murdoch) – 3:44
6. "Funny Little Frog" (Brittany Stallings) – 4:04
7. "If You Could Speak" (Catherine Ireton and Anna Miles) – 2:47
8. "Musician Please Take Heed" (Catherine Ireton) – 3:58
9. "Perfection as a Hipster" (Neil Hannon and Catherine Ireton) – 3:26
10. "Come Monday Night" (Catherine Ireton) – 3:28
11. "Music Room Window" (instrumental) – 1:00
12. "I Just Want Your Jeans" (Asya) – 3:24
13. "I'll Have to Dance with Cassie" (Catherine Ireton) – 3:47
14. "A Down and Dusky Blonde" (Asya, Dina Bankole, Catherine Ireton, Celia Garcia, Brittany Stallings) – 4:49

"Funny Little Frog" – single, released on 31 July 2009:

1. "Funny Little Frog" (Brittany Stallings)
2. "Mary's Market" (Stuart Murdoch)

Stills – EP, released on 3 November 2009:

1. "I'm in Love with the City" (Catherine Ireton)
2. "He's a Loving Kind of Boy" (Stuart Murdoch)
3. "Stills" (Alex Klobouk)
4. "Baby's Just Waiting" (Celia Garcia)
5. "The Psychiatrist Is In" (Catherine Ireton)

"Baby, You're Blind" – single, released on 24 May 2010:

1. "Baby, You're Blind" (Linnea Jönsson)
2. "A Down and Dusky Blonde" (Dina Bankole, Catherine Ireton - new version)

All the records were published by Belle and Sebastian's home record companies: Rough Trade Records in the UK and Matador Records in the US.

The album was promoted in concerts on a short tour which was held in November 2009: during the Crossing Borders Festival in The Hague in the Netherlands (20/11), in the 100 Club in London (21/11), and the Usher Hall in Edinburgh (29/11). The latter featured the BBC Scottish Symphony Orchestra.

The above pieces include only part of the music material which has been recorded within the project so far.

== Character and themes of the songs ==
Owing to Stuart Murdoch's authorship and the accompaniment of the group Belle and Sebastian, the songs from the project God Help the Girl much resemble in their musical aspect the other work of Stuart Murdoch and Belle and Sebastian band. These similarities are all the more visible that some of the songs ("Funny Little Frog", "Act of the Apostle") were taken directly from the band's repertory and were performed earlier by Murdoch himself. In the project God Help the Girl, however, the band limited itself to the accompaniment, the main roles are played by the vocalist – Catherine Ireton and others; which means that the released singles and albums cannot be regarded, strictly speaking, as part of the output of Belle and Sebastian.

The invitation of female vocalists to take part in the project resulted from the subject matter of the songs and the planned film: their main character is a girl named Eve, who dropped out of college (where she was not a very good student), starts work, but wants to change her life – she would like to become a singer or a songwriter. She also has many love and other personal problems – she has just absconded from the psychiatric ward. The problems, however, do not look dramatic in the songs in the form as they were written by Murdoch and are performed by the vocalists. Most of the pieces are cheerful in tone, with elements of irony and self-irony; even the more reflective songs, like "Come Monday Night", have a cheerful and catchy tune. In the musical aspect, God Help the Girl is a reference to, or even pastiche of British girl bands performing in the 1960s, with a rich orchestral arrangement.
