= Piazza, New York Catcher =

Song by Belle and Sebastian

from the album Dear Catastrophe Waitress
- Released: 6 October 2003
- Recorded: Summer 2003
- Genre: Baroque pop
- Length: 3:03
- Label: Rough Trade
- Producer: Trevor Horn

"Piazza, New York Catcher" is a song by Scottish band Belle and Sebastian, first appearing on their 2003 album Dear Catastrophe Waitress. With its title taken from baseball player Mike Piazza, the song details the band's lead singer Stuart Murdoch's romance of his future wife in San Francisco.

The song appeared on the soundtrack of the 2007 film Juno.

== Background ==
The song takes its name from MLB catcher Mike Piazza, who at the time played for the New York Mets, and discusses rumors of Piazza's sexuality. Murdoch said of Piazza, after seeing him play at Shea Stadium, "I was almost instantly drawn to Piazza. That’s the thing about him; he was a talisman wherever he went. He was the kind of player people tended to follow, and we thought he was a good guy."

FanGraphs sabermetrician Carson Cistulli (now working for the Toronto Blue Jays) attempted to find the exact date of the game depicted in the song, which described Piazza as hitting for a .318 batting average. He concluded that "Belle and Sebastian are probably referring to no specific Mets-Giants game — or, if they are, it’s most likely a game from August of 2002, with a reference to a batting average from a different date."

In 2025, Piazza publicly addressed the song for the first time, saying that the song made him feel "flattered, obviously" because "any time you’re remembered in pop culture like that, it’s nice." About the gay rumors referenced in the song, he said, "As you get older, you just don’t get as wrapped up in those things, or you just don’t have the energy."
