= Alicia Rickter =

American model and actress

- Born: September 21, 1972 (age 53); Long Beach, California, U.S.
- Height: 5 ft 8 in (1.73 m)
- Spouse: Mike Piazza (m. 2005)
- Children: 3

Playboy centerfold appearance
- October 1995
- Preceded by: Donna D'Errico
- Succeeded by: Holly Witt

Alicia Rickter (born September 21, 1972) is an American model and actress. She appeared as "Laura" in the comedy Buying the Cow (2002), and on the TV series Baywatch and The Young and the Restless.

== Career ==
Rickter posed nude for Playboy magazine as Miss October 1995. Although she was referred to as the 500th Playboy Playmate, it was not realized at the time that two of the earliest Playmates (Marilyn Waltz and Margaret Scott) were the same person, making Rickter #499. She has also appeared in three Playboy videos.

Rickter was the vice president of AC Reggiana 1919, an Italian soccer club in which she and her husband had an 85% ownership stake. In June 2018, Rickter and Piazza announced to the club's fans that they were not going to enroll the team for the 2018–19 Serie C, and they would put it up for sale. This caused the club to be excluded from the professional leagues. The team was re-established in July 2018 under the name Reggio Audace Football Club, before returning to its former name in July 2020. The Court of Justice of Reggio Emilia declared AC Reggiana 1919 bankrupt in December 2019.

== Personal life ==
Rickter married baseball player Mike Piazza on January 29, 2005, in Miami. They have two daughters and a son.

== Filmography ==
=== Film ===
Year	Title	Role	Notes
2002	Buying the Cow	Laura	

=== Television ===
Year	Title	Role	Notes
1998	Unhappily Ever After	Girl	Episode: "Undercover Cheerleader"
1999	Thanks	Rose	Episode: "Marriage"
2000–2001	Baywatch	Carrie Sharp	7 episodes
2001	Off Centre	Midnight Laundry Girl	Episode: "Feeling Shellfish"

Melissa Holliday	Lisa Marie Scott	Stacy Sanches	Danelle Folta	Cynthia Gwyn Brown	Rhonda Adams
Heidi Mark	Rachel Jeán Marteen	Donna D'Errico	Alicia Rickter	Holly Witt	Samantha Torres
