= I'm a Cuckoo =

2004 single by Belle and Sebastian

Single by Belle & Sebastian

from the album Dear Catastrophe Waitress
- Released: 16 February 2004
- Studio: Sarm Hook End (Checkendon, Oxfordshire)
- Genre: Indie pop
- Length: 5:26
- Label: Rough Trade
- Songwriters: Richard Colburn, Mick Cooke, Chris Geddes, Stevie Jackson, Bobby Kildea, Sarah Martin, Stuart Murdoch, Robert Chater, Darren Seltmann
- Producer: Trevor Horn

Belle & Sebastian singles chronology
"Step into My Office, Baby" (2003)	"I'm a Cuckoo" (2004)	"Funny Little Frog" (2006)

"I'm a Cuckoo" is the second single from Scottish indie pop band Belle & Sebastian's sixth studio album, Dear Catastrophe Waitress (2003). Produced by Trevor Horn, the track was released as a single on 16 February 2004. B-side "Stop, Look and Listen" merges into "Passion Fruit" at the end of a song—an instrumental piece which was performed live prior to its release. The front cover features Shantha Roberts.

"I'm a Cuckoo" fared better on the UK Singles Chart than previous single "Step into My Office, Baby", reaching number 14. It is the only Belle & Sebastian song to chart in Spain, peaking at number 19, and was their most recent hit in Sweden, reaching number 59. A Japanese version of the song was released as a B-side to the Japanese version of Belle & Sebastian's subsequent EP, Books.

== Critical reception ==
An AllMusic reviewer described the track as being "like the indie pop version of Thin Lizzy", who are also mentioned in the lyrics.

Reviewing the remix, PopMatters said, "the Avalanches’ remake draws out a more organic side with casual wind instruments and warm percussion. The samples of hustling, bustling chit-chat strike a note of extroverted gregariousness that shy, retiring types like Belle and Sebastian sometimes need someone else to bring out of 'em."

== Music video ==
The video for "I'm a Cuckoo" features Scottish Olympic 100m gold medallist Allan Wells as a running coach and lead singer, Stuart Murdoch, as an aspiring runner.

== Track listings ==
Standard CD single

1. "I'm a Cuckoo"
2. "Stop, Look and Listen"
3. "I'm a Cuckoo (by the Avalanches)"
4. "(I Believe In) Travellin' Light"
5. "I'm a Cuckoo" (video)

UK 7-inch single

1. "I'm a Cuckoo"
2. "(I Believe In) Travellin' Light"

UK DVD single

1. "I'm a Cuckoo" (video)
2. "Stop, Look and Listen" (video)
3. "I'm a Cuckoo (by the Avalanches)" (audio)
4. "(I Believe In) Travellin' Light" (audio)

== Charts ==
Chart (2004)	Peak position
Scotland Singles (OCC)	11
Spain (Promusicae)	19
Sweden (Sverigetopplistan)	59
UK Singles (OCC)	14
UK Indie (OCC)	2

== Release history ==
Region	Date	Format(s)	Label(s)	Ref.
United Kingdom	16 February 2004	7-inch vinyl; CD	Rough Trade	
Japan	25 February 2004	CD	Rough Trade	
