= God Help the Girl (film) =

- Theatrical release poster
- Directed by: Stuart Murdoch
- Written by: Stuart Murdoch
- Produced by: Barry Mendel
- Starring: Emily Browning; Olly Alexander; Hannah Murray
- Cinematography: Giles Nuttgens
- Edited by: David Arthur
- Production companies: Barry Mendel Productions; Zephyr Films; Singer Films; Creative Scotland; HanWay Films; British Film Company; Savalas Film
- Distributed by: Metrodome
- Release dates: 18 January 2014 (Sundance Film Festival); 22 August 2014 (United Kingdom)
- Running time: 111 minutes
- Country: United Kingdom
- Language: English
- Box office: $102,757

God Help the Girl is a 2014 British musical romantic drama film written and directed by Stuart Murdoch of the band Belle and Sebastian. It follows three friends who form a band in Glasgow. The film was preceded by the album God Help the Girl in 2009.

== Plot ==
Eve escapes from the psychiatric hospital where she is being treated for anorexia nervosa and makes her way to Glasgow, hoping to become a musician. At a gig, she meets James, a lifeguard and aspiring songwriter. He introduces her to his guitar student, Cassie, and the three become friends.

Eve meets Anton, the arrogant singer of a Glasgow band attracting attention from a local radio station. She gives him a tape of her music to pass on and they begin seeing each other.

James convinces Eve she needs bass and drums to finish her songs. They and Cassie form a band, God Help the Girl, with local musicians. Anton admits he never gave Eve's tape to the radio producers, saying she needs better production and musicianship, and they argue.

James discovers Eve's relationship with Anton and becomes distanced from her. Feeling alone, Eve takes drugs and returns to the hospital. She tells James she plans to attend music college in London, and they reconcile. After God Help the Girl perform their final concert, the radio station plays Eve's tape. The next day, Eve leaves for London.

== Cast ==
- Emily Browning as Eve
- Olly Alexander as James
- Hannah Murray as Cassie
- Pierre Boulanger as Anton

== Release ==
God Help the Girl premiered in-competition in the "World Cinema Dramatic Competition" at the 2014 Sundance Film Festival on 18 January 2014. It opened the Generations section at the 64th Berlin International Film Festival on 9 February 2014.

After its premiere at the Sundance Film Festival, Amplify acquired the distribution rights of the film. It was released theatrically and video-on-demand on 5 September 2014 in the United States.

== Reception ==
On the review aggregator Rotten Tomatoes, God Help the Girl has a 67% approval rating based on 76 reviews, with an average score of 5.69/10. The consensus reads: "While it may strike harder-hearted viewers as excessively twee, God Help the Girl floats by on its sweet charm and talented cast."

Dennis Harvey of Variety wrote that God Help the Girl "is a slender exercise in self-conscious charm". David Fear of Esquire praised it as "rife with the kind of giddy thrills and hormonal flushes you associate with being a teen". Jonathan Romney of Film Comment said that "it's easy to categorize Murdoch's film as a vanity project, but if it is, it's a very honest one". David D'Arcy of Screen International said the film "has a soft whimsy that connects to a time before video clips put editing rhythms into overdrive".

Xan Brooks of the Guardian gave God Help the Girl three out of five, writing: "It's warm and generous, verging on the sentimental; a film that crystallises the best and worst of Belle and Sebastian's songwriting skills." Another Guardian writer, Leslie Felperin, gave it two out of five and called it "disastrous, fatally flawed by a shoddy script and poor direction, like something made by the most ostensibly talented guy at art school ... It's not funny or clever, or even musically very interesting. It's just bad." Rodrigo Perez of Indiewire wrote: "A major gaffe, God Help The Girl finds a great artist taking on a huge challenge and stumbling painfully on its ambition almost every step of the way." David Rooney of The Hollywood Reporter called the film "an indie musical that feels like one long B-side".

Sarah Sahim, writing for Pitchfork, called God Help the Girl "an egregious mess" that romanticises eating disorders. She criticised the lack of racial diversity as "a microcosmic view of what is wrought by racial exclusivity that is omnipresent in indie rock". Murdoch responded on Twitter: "God knows I've yearned to know and love women and men of many nations, but being a poor sick white boy from Scotland has dashed my ambitions."

Writing for Vulture in 2016, Nathan Rabin named God Help the Girl one of 10 Sundance movies that "should have been hits", writing: "Murdoch has long been an extraordinarily cinematic songwriter, with a gift for conjuring up melancholy worlds with his words and music. With God Help the Girl, he proves to be a predictably literary and musical filmmaker ... God Help the Girl represents the perfect cinematic representation of Belle and Sebastian’s worldview, which, depending on your opinion of the group, is either high praise or a terrific reason to stay away."

== Accolades ==
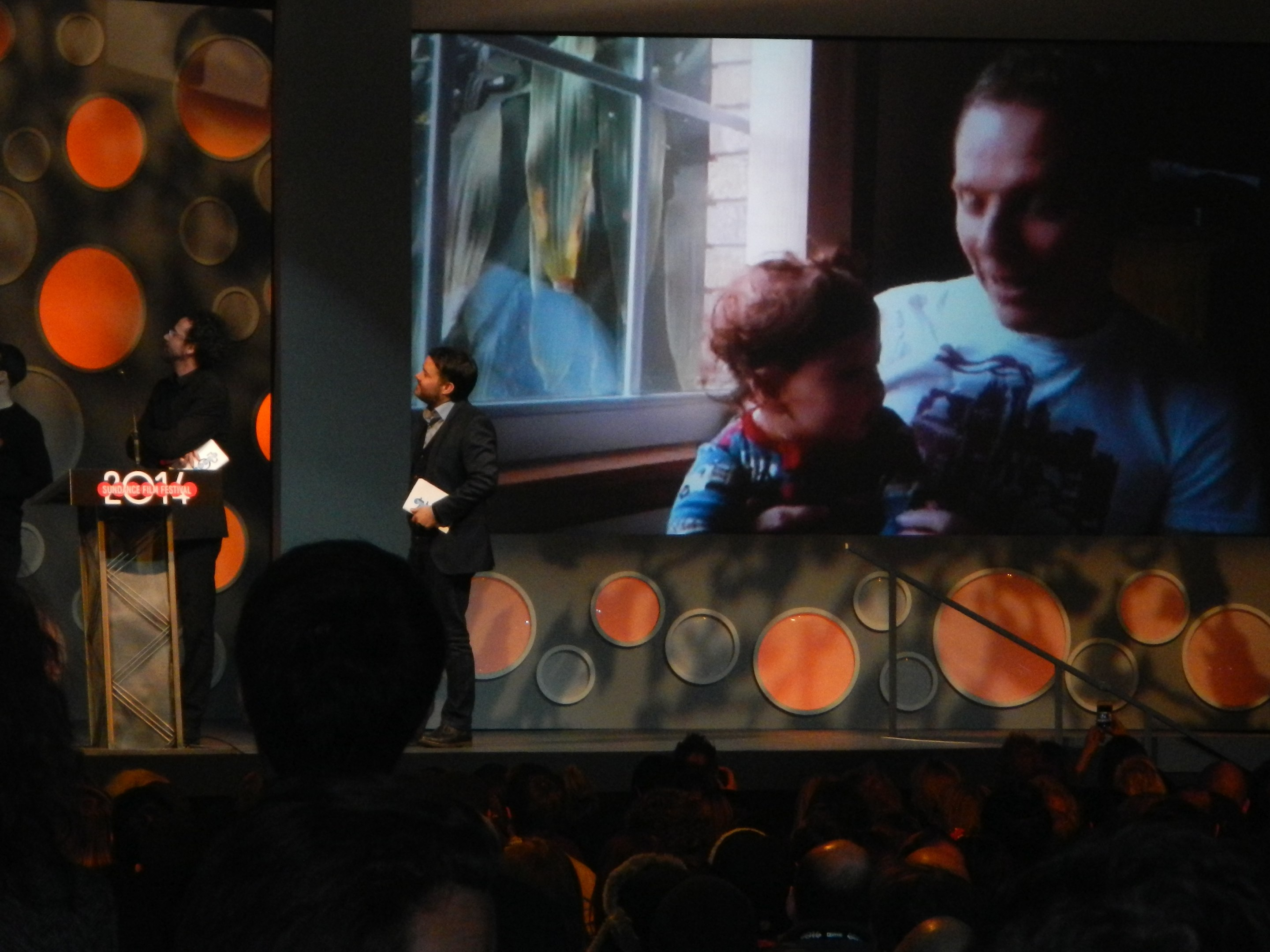
God Help the Girl won the Special Jury Award at the 2014 Sundance Film Festival.

Year	Award	Category	Recipient	Result
2014	Sundance Film Festival	World Cinema Grand Jury Prize: Dramatic	Stuart Murdoch	Nominated
2014	Sundance Film Festival	World Cinema Dramatic Special Jury Award (Ensemble)	Emily Browning; Olly Alexander; Hannah Murray; Pierre Boulanger	Won
2014	Berlin International Film Festival	Crystal Bear	Stuart Murdoch	Nominated
