= Belle and Sebastian Write About Love =

Write About Love

Studio album by Belle and Sebastian
- Released: 11 October 2010
- Recorded: Early/Mid 2010
- Studios: The Sound Factory, Los Angeles, California
- Genre: Indie pop
- Length: 43:15
- Label: Rough Trade
- Producer: Tony Hoffer

Belle and Sebastian chronology
The BBC Sessions (2008)	Write About Love (2010)	The Third Eye Centre (2013)

Singles from Belle and Sebastian Write About Love
- 1. "Write About Love" Released: 2010; 2. "I Want the World to Stop" Released: 2011; 3. "Come on Sister" Released: 2011

Professional ratings
Aggregate scores
Source	Rating
AnyDecentMusic?	7.1/10
Metacritic	75/100
Review scores
Source	Rating
AllMusic	4/5 stars
The A.V. Club	B
Chicago Tribune	2/4 stars
The Guardian	4/5 stars
Mojo	4/5 stars
NME	6/10
Pitchfork	8.2/10
Q	4/5 stars
Rolling Stone	3/5 stars
Spin	7/10

Belle and Sebastian Write about Love (known informally as Write about Love) is the eighth studio album by indie pop group Belle and Sebastian, released on 11 October 2010. It was the second collaboration between the band and Tony Hoffer, who had produced their previous album, The Life Pursuit (2006).

== History ==
The album was first referenced by the group in early 2010, when they mentioned in the Q&A section of their official website that they had recently visited Los Angeles, California, to record. In a follow-up question, Stuart Murdoch confirmed that producer Tony Hoffer had returned to produce. The album's title was officially announced by Murdoch in a posting on the band's website on 11 August 2010, and he revealed the album cover and release dates, as well as a clip of a planned Belle and Sebastian television show, on 16 August.

Two tracks from the album were played by the band during their 2010 tour: "I Didn't See It Coming", a duet featuring Sarah Martin and Stuart Murdoch on vocals, and "I'm Not Living in the Real World", which features Stevie Jackson on lead vocals. On 16 August 2010, another track was announced, titled "I Want the World to Stop". Norah Jones is featured on the track "Little Lou, Ugly Jack, Prophet John", which was also included on Jones' compilation album ...Featuring Norah Jones, released one month after Write About Love.

On 3 September 2010, the names of five new songs set to feature on the album were shown during the credits of the promotional Belle and Sebastian TV programme: "Blue Eyes of a Millionaire", "Suicide Girl", and "I Can See Your Future" (all credited to the group), as well as "The Telephone Song" and "If I Can't Help Myself" (both credited to guitarist Stevie Jackson). Of these songs, only "I Can See Your Future" ended up on the album, though "Blue Eyes of a Millionaire" and "Suicide Girl" were included as bonus tracks on some editions.

== Release ==
The title track was announced as the lead single from the album, and was also released as a free download from the band's website for a limited time. The single was released in the US iTunes Store on 7 September 2010, with a worldwide release on 25 September. "I Want the World to Stop" topped Allaccess.com's "Impacting Songs" US radio chart on 5 October 2010.

On 18 June 2011, they released Come on Sister EP featuring remixed versions of the titular songs along with the song "Blue Eyes of a Millionaire". The cover features Katie Alcock photographed by Stuart Murdoch. The EP charted in the UK Physical Singles Chart, peaking at number 13.

== Commercial performance ==
Its first week of release, the album entered the UK Albums Chart, where it peaked at number 8, the band's highest placement on the chart (tied with The Life Pursuit and A Bit of Previous). Additionally, the album topped the UK Independent Albums chart, and "I Didn't See It Coming" entered the UK Independent Singles chart at number 38. The album reached number 21 in Ireland, the band's highest placement in that country until their next album. In the United States, Write About Love peaked at number 15 on the Billboard 200, the band's highest placement on the chart, while it entered the Italian albums chart at number 65, nine spots lower than The Life Pursuit, which had reached number 56.

In 2011, the album was awarded a silver certification from the Independent Music Companies Association, indicating sales of at least 20,000 copies throughout Europe. As of 2014, it has sold 68,199 copies in the United States.

== Track listing ==
All tracks are written by Belle & Sebastian, all vocals by Stuart Murdoch except where noted.

No.	Title	Lead vocals	Length
1.	"I Didn't See It Coming"	Sarah Martin with Murdoch	5:02
2.	"Come on Sister"		3:53
3.	"Calculating Bimbo"		4:21
4.	"I Want the World to Stop"		4:33
5.	"Little Lou, Ugly Jack, Prophet John"	Murdoch & Norah Jones	4:33
6.	"Write About Love"	Murdoch & Carey Mulligan	2:53
7.	"I'm Not Living in the Real World"	Stevie Jackson	3:09
8.	"The Ghost of Rockschool"		4:34
9.	"Read the Blessed Pages"		2:43
10.	"I Can See Your Future"	Martin	3:50
11.	"Sunday's Pretty Icons"	Murdoch with Martin	3:44

Download-only bonus track
No.	Title	Length
12.	"Blue Eyes of a Millionaire"

Limited-edition bonus 7" single included with CD and LP purchases from Matador's web store
No.	Title	Length
1.	"Last Trip"
2.	"Suicide Girl"

== Personnel ==
- Norah Jones – vocals (5)
- Carey Mulligan – vocals (6)
- Mick Cooke – arranger
- Sarah Martin – arranger (10)
- Tony Hoffer – producer, mixing, programming
- Todd Burke – engineer
- Cameron Lister – assistant engineer
- Frank Arkwright – mastering
- Stuart Murdoch – vocals, liner notes, photography
- Marisa Privitera – photography assistant
- Seth Mitchell – guest guitar
- Eric Gorfain – violin, conductor (4, 6, 10)
- Daphne Chen – violin (4, 6, 10)
- Melissa Reiner – violin (4, 6, 10)
- Amy Wickman – violin (4, 6, 10)
- Wes Precourt – violin (4, 6, 10)
- Lauren Chipman – viola (4, 6, 10)
- Richard Dodd – cello (4, 6, 10)
- Matt Cooker – cello (4, 6, 10)
- John Krovoza – cello (4, 6, 10)
- Noah Gladstone – trombone (4, 10)
- Bruce Otto – bass trombone (4, 10)
- Stephanie Stetson – French horn (10)
- Danielle Ondarza – French horn (10)
- Stephanie O'Keefe – French horn (10)

== Charts ==
Chart performance for Belle and Sebastian Write About Love
Chart (2010)	Peak position
Australian Albums (ARIA)	74
Austrian Albums (Ö3 Austria)	40
Belgian Albums (Ultratop Flanders)	51
Belgian Albums (Ultratop Wallonia)	77
Dutch Albums (Album Top 100)	41
Finnish Albums (Suomen virallinen lista)	30
French Albums (SNEP)	54
German Albums (Offizielle Top 100)	38
Irish Albums (IRMA)	21
Italian Albums (FIMI)	65
Mexican Albums (AMPROFON)	78
Norwegian Albums (VG-lista)	28
Swedish Albums (Sverigetopplistan)	18
Swiss Albums (Schweizer Hitparade)	37
UK Albums (Official Charts)	8
UK Independent Albums (Official Charts)	1
US Billboard 200	15
US Independent Albums (Billboard)	2
