= Michael Hunter (composer) =

Scottish composer and musician

- Born: Glasgow, Scotland
- Other name: Pablo
- Website: www.olbapmusic.com

Michael Hunter is a Scottish composer and musician from Glasgow. He is best known for producing the original soundtrack and score for Grand Theft Auto: San Andreas (2004) and Grand Theft Auto IV (2008).

He has also released music under the aliases of Pablo and The Butch Cassidy Sound System. On 22 August 2011, he released his debut studio album, State of Flux. His second studio album, Circuit Brain, was released on 29 August 2018.
