= Step into My Office, Baby =

2003 single by Belle and Sebastian

"Step Into My Office, Baby"

Single by Belle & Sebastian

from the album Dear Catastrophe Waitress
- Released: 17 November 2003
- Recorded: Sarm West, Sarm Hook End
- Length: 4:14
- Label: Rough Trade
- Songwriters: Richard Colburn; Mick Cooke; Chris Geddes; Stevie Jackson; Sarah Martin; Stuart Murdoch; Bobby Kildea
- Producer: Trevor Horn

Belle & Sebastian singles chronology
"I'm Waking Up to Us" (2001)	"Step Into My Office, Baby" (2003)	"I'm a Cuckoo" (2004)

"Step Into My Office, Baby" is a song by Belle & Sebastian, released as their first single for Rough Trade Records in 2003. The track was produced by Trevor Horn and is lifted from Dear Catastrophe Waitress. The front cover features band member Bobby Kildea with Roxanne Clifford (later of Veronica Falls) and Hannah Robinson. The track reached number 32 on the UK Singles Chart, number 80 in the Netherlands, and came in at number 64 on Australia's Triple J Hottest 100 in 2003. The single release includes "Love on the March", which the band recorded with Divine Comedy producer Darren Allison.

== Reception ==
Spin said the song, "swaggers into the party like a drunken junior accountant in a Hermits T-shirt, slinging British-invasion guitar twang, Swingin' Sixties orchestral charts, and hostile-work environment double entendres ("I'm pushin' for a raise")".

== Track listings ==
CD

1. "Step into My Office, Baby" – 4:14
2. "Love on the March" – 3:49
3. "Desperation Made a Fool of Me" – 4:15
4. "Step into My Office, Baby" (video)

7-inch vinyl

1. "Step into My Office, Baby" – 4:14
2. "Love on the March" – 3:49

DVD

1. "Step into My Office, Baby" (video)
2. "Love on the March" (audio and photo gallery)
3. "Desperation Made a Fool of Me" (audio)

== Charts ==
Chart (2003–2004)	Peak position
Netherlands (Single Top 100)	80
Scotland Singles (OCC)	25
UK Singles (OCC)	32
UK Indie (OCC)	2

== Release history ==
Region	Date	Format(s)	Label(s)	Ref.
United Kingdom	17 November 2003	7-inch vinyl; CD; DVD	Rough Trade	
Japan	19 November 2003	CD	Rough Trade	
