= Funny Little Frog =

2006 single by Belle and Sebastian

Single by Belle & Sebastian

from the album The Life Pursuit
- B-side: "Meat and Potatoes"; "I Took a Long Hard Look"; "The Eighth Station of the Cross Kebab House"
- Released: 16 January 2006
- Studio: The Sound Factory (Los Angeles)
- Genre: Northern soul; glam rock
- Length: 3:08
- Label: Rough Trade
- Songwriters: Richard Colburn; Mick Cooke; Chris Geddes; Stevie Jackson; Bobby Kildea; Sarah Martin; Stuart Murdoch
- Producer: Tony Hoffer

Belle & Sebastian singles chronology
"I'm a Cuckoo" (2004)	"Funny Little Frog" (2006)	"The Blues Are Still Blue" (2006)

"Funny Little Frog" is the first single released from Scottish indie pop band Belle & Sebastian's seventh studio album, The Life Pursuit (2006). The track was released in January 2006 on Rough Trade Records and was produced by Tony Hoffer. The single became the band's highest-charting single in the UK, reaching number 13. The artwork for the single features Julie Coyle and Marisa Privitera. A different version of "Funny Little Frog" appears on Stuart Murdoch's 2009 album God Help the Girl.

== Track listings ==
All songs were written by Belle & Sebastian.

UK CD single

1. "Funny Little Frog"
2. "Meat and Potatoes"
3. "I Took a Long Hard Look"

UK and Australian 7-inch single

1. "Funny Little Frog"
2. "The Eighth Station of the Cross Kebab House"

UK and Australian DVD single

1. "Funny Little Frog" (video)
2. "Lazy Line Painter Jane" (live in Glasgow)

Japanese CD single

1. "Funny Little Frog"
2. "Meat and Potatoes"
3. "I Took a Long Hard Look"
4. "Funny Little Frog" (video)
5. "Lazy Line Painter Jane" (live in Glasgow)

== Credits and personnel ==
Credits are taken from the UK CD single liner notes.

Studios

- Recorded at The Sound Factory (Los Angeles)
- Mixed at Sunset Sound (Los Angeles)
- Mastered at Metropolis (London, England)

Personnel

- James Swinburne – saxophone
- Tony Hoffer – production, mixing, engineering
- Todd Burke – engineering
- Jason Mott – assistant engineering (Sound Factory)
- Chris Reynolds – assistant engineering (Sunset Sound)
- Frank Arkwright – mastering
- Keith Dodds – sleeve design and layout
- Stuart Murdoch – photography
- Patrick Doyle – photography assistance
- Marisa Privitera – photography assistance

== Charts ==
Chart (2006)	Peak position
Ireland (IRMA)	32
Scotland Singles (OCC)	3
Switzerland Airplay (Schweizer Hitparade)	98
UK Singles (OCC)	13
UK Indie (OCC)	2

== Release history ==
Region	Date	Format(s)	Label(s)	Ref.
Australia	16 January 2006	7-inch vinyl; DVD	Shock	
United Kingdom	16 January 2006	CD	Rough Trade	
Japan	15 February 2006	CD	Rough Trade	
