= The Blues Are Still Blue =

2006 single by Belle & Sebastian

Single by Belle & Sebastian

from the album The Life Pursuit
- Released: 3 April 2006
- Length: 4:08
- Label: Rough Trade
- Songwriter(s): Richard Colburn, Mick Cooke, Chris Geddes, Stevie Jackson, Bobby Kildea, Sarah Martin, Stuart Murdoch
- Producer(s): Tony Hoffer

Belle & Sebastian singles chronology
"Funny Little Frog" (2006)	"The Blues Are Still Blue" (2006)	"White Collar Boy" (2006)

"The Blues Are Still Blue" is the second single from Scottish indie pop band Belle & Sebastian's seventh studio album, The Life Pursuit (2006). The track was released on 3 April 2006 on Rough Trade Records and was produced by Tony Hoffer. The single reached number 25 on the UK Singles Chart.. The song is their only top-50 hit in Australia, where it peaked at number 43 in June 2006 as an extended play.

== Track listings ==
All songs were written by Belle & Sebastian

CD

1. "The Blues Are Still Blue" – 4:08
2. "The Life Pursuit" – 4:34
3. "Mr. Richard" – 2:35

7-inch vinyl

1. "The Blues Are Still Blue" – 4:09
2. "Whiskey in the Jar" – 4:44

DVD

1. "The Blues Are Still Blue" (video)
2. "Roy Walker" (live at The Botanics)

The Blues Are Still Blue (Australian 2006 Tour EP)

1. "The Blues are Still Blue" (From the UK ‘The Blues Are Still Blue’ single)
2. "I Took a Long Hard Look" (From the UK ‘Funny Little Frog’ maxi CDS)
3. "The Life Pursuit" (From the UK ‘The Blues Are Still Blue’ maxi CDS)
4. "Whiskey in the Jar" (From the UK ‘The Blues Are Still Blue’ 7")
5. "Funny Little Frog" (From the UK ‘Funny Little Frog’ single)
6. "Meat and Potatoes" (From the UK ‘Funny Little Frog’ maxi CDS)
7. "Mr Richard" (From the UK ‘The Blues Are Still Blue’ maxi CDS)
8. "The Eighth Station of the Cross Kebab House" (From the UK ‘Funny Little Frog’ maxi CDS)

== Charts ==
Chart (2006)	Peak position
Australia (ARIA)	43
Scotland (OCC)	9
UK Singles (OCC)	25
UK Indie (OCC)	2

== Release history ==
Region	Date	Format(s)	Label(s)	Ref.
United Kingdom	3 April 2006	7-inch vinyl; CD; DVD	Rough Trade	
Australia	29 May 2006	CD	Rough Trade	
