= Mike Piazza =

American baseball player (born 1968)

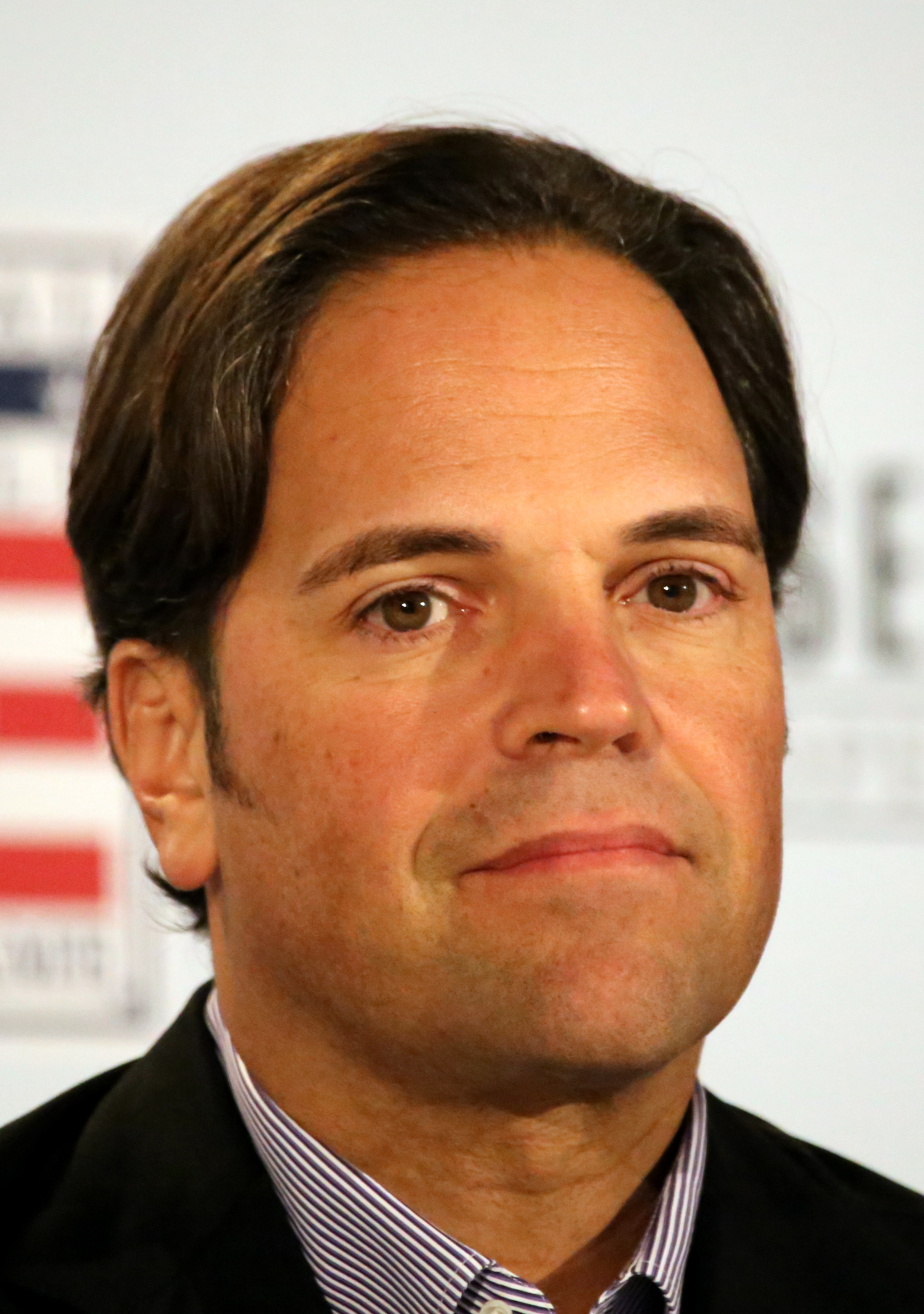
- Piazza in 2016
- Catcher
- Born: September 4, 1968 (age 58); Norristown, Pennsylvania, U.S.
- Batted: Right Threw: Right

MLB debut
- September 1, 1992, for the Los Angeles Dodgers

Last MLB appearance
- September 30, 2007, for the Oakland Athletics

MLB statistics
- Batting average: .308
- Hits: 2,127
- Home runs: 427
- Runs batted in: 1,335
- Stats at Baseball Reference

Teams
- Los Angeles Dodgers (1992–1998); Florida Marlins (1998); New York Mets (1998–2005); San Diego Padres (2006); Oakland Athletics (2007)

Career highlights and awards
- 12× All-Star (1993–2002, 2004, 2005); NL Rookie of the Year (1993); 10× Silver Slugger Award (1993–2002); New York Mets No. 31 retired; New York Mets Hall of Fame

Member of the National

Baseball Hall of Fame
- Induction: 2016
- Vote: 83.0% (fourth ballot)
Medals
Manager for Italy
European Championship
| Bronze medal – third place | 2021 Turin | National team |

Michael Joseph Piazza (/piˈɑːtsə/ pee-AHT-sa; born September 4, 1968) is an American former professional baseball catcher who played 16 seasons in Major League Baseball (MLB), from 1992 to 2007, and is a member of the National Baseball Hall of Fame and Museum. Piazza played most notably for the New York Mets and Los Angeles Dodgers, while also having brief stints with the Florida Marlins, San Diego Padres, and Oakland Athletics. A 12-time All-Star and 10-time Silver Slugger Award winner at catcher, he produced strong offensive numbers at his position; in his career, he recorded 427 home runs—a record 396 of which were hit as catcher—along with a .308 batting average and 1,335 runs batted in (RBI).

Piazza was drafted by the Dodgers in the 1988 MLB draft as a favor from Tommy Lasorda to Piazza's father. He was the last player selected by the Dodgers that year and was the latest drafted pick signed in his draft class to play in the Major Leagues. Initially a first baseman, Piazza converted to catcher in the minor leagues at Lasorda's suggestion to improve his chances of being promoted. He made his major league debut in 1992 and the following year was named the National League (NL) Rookie of the Year and was an All-Star for the first of 10 consecutive seasons. Piazza immediately impressed with his ability to hit for power and average. His best year as a Dodger came in 1997 when he batted .362, hit 40 home runs, and had 124 RBI, leading to a runner-up finish in voting for the NL Most Valuable Player Award. In 1998, he was traded to the Marlins and then a week later to the Mets, with whom he spent most of the remainder of his career. He helped the Mets reach the 2000 World Series, the only World Series appearance of his career. After the 2005 season, Piazza left the Mets to play one season each for the Padres and Athletics before retiring after the 2007 season.

Piazza is regarded as one of the best offensive catchers in baseball history. He had at least one RBI in 15 straight games for the Mets in 2000, the second-longest RBI streak ever. In 2013, the Mets inducted Piazza into the New York Mets Hall of Fame. In 2016, Piazza was elected to the Baseball Hall of Fame.

Piazza owned the Italian soccer team A.C. Reggiana 1919, which played for two seasons (2017–2018) in Serie C under his leadership before its non-registration due to continued financial troubles. He intended to serve as the manager of the Italian national baseball team in 2020 and 2021 championships, though he was unable to do so because of the COVID-19 pandemic; he finally got his chance to manage Team Italy at the 2023 World Baseball Classic.

== Early life ==
Piazza was born in Norristown, Pennsylvania, grew up in Phoenixville, Pennsylvania, and attended Phoenixville Area High School. He is the second-oldest son of an Italian father named Vince (1932–2021) and a Slovak mother named Veronica, with brothers Vince Jr., Dan, Tony, and Tom. His father was the son of Italian immigrants from Sciacca, Sicily. Tom's godfather was former MLB manager Tommy Lasorda. Mike grew up a Philadelphia Phillies fan and fan of Philadelphia sports, and admiring Hall of Fame third baseman Mike Schmidt. Piazza watched the Philadelphia 76ers court side in their January 1983 game versus the Los Angeles Lakers when Philadelphia star Julius Erving performed a spectacular play by swiping the ball and completing his famous Rock-a-Baby dunk, which Piazza cited as one of his indelible childhood memories as a sports fan. Vince Piazza earned a fortune of more than $100 million in used cars and real estate, and attempted several times to purchase an MLB franchise. When the Dodgers—managed by Vince's childhood friend Tommy Lasorda, the godfather of Mike Piazza's youngest brother, Tommy—visited Philadelphia, Piazza visited the Dodger clubhouse and served as a bat boy in the dugout.

Vince's own hopes of playing baseball had ended at the age of 16 when he left school to support his family. He saw that Piazza had potential in the sport, and began encouraging his son to build his arm strength at the age of five. When he was 16, Piazza received personal instruction in his backyard batting cage from Ted Williams. The Hall of Famer praised his talent, advised him not to let anyone change his swing, and autographed Piazza's copy of Williams' The Science of Hitting. Vince threw hundreds of pitches nightly to his son, who shared his father's focus on baseball, clearing snow if necessary to practice his hitting and, after reaching the major leagues, practicing on Christmas Eve. Piazza graduated from Phoenixville Area High School in 1986, after which he went to South Florida and joined the Miami Hurricanes his freshman year; receiving no playing time that season, Piazza transferred to Miami-Dade Community College. Piazza played first base at Miami-Dade in 1988. In 29 games, he hit .364 with three home runs and drove in 23 runs.

== Major league career ==
=== Los Angeles Dodgers ===
After his father asked Lasorda to select Piazza as a favor, the Miami-Dade Community College student was drafted by the Dodgers in the 62nd round of the 1988 MLB amateur draft as the 1,390th player picked out of 1,395 players. Lasorda asked Piazza to give up his first base position and learn how to catch to improve his chances of reaching the major leagues and helped him attend a special training camp for catchers in the Dominican Republic. Piazza became an excellent hitter, especially for a catcher. His MLB debut came with the Dodgers on September 1, 1992, against the Chicago Cubs. He drew a walk in his first plate appearance and then doubled to deep center field in his first official at-bat, against Mike Harkey of the Cubs. He hit his first home run on September 12, 1992, against Steve Reed of the San Francisco Giants. He only appeared in 21 games that season, hitting .232.

Piazza won the NL Rookie of the Year Award in 1993 after appearing in 149 games, hitting .318, slugging 35 home runs, and driving in 112 RBI. He was also selected to the 1993 Major League Baseball All-Star Game, his first of 10 consecutive (and 12 total) All-Star appearances. Until Joc Pederson passed him in 2015, Piazza's 18 home runs before the All-Star break was a Dodgers' rookie record. In 1996, Piazza hit .336 with 36 home runs and 105 RBI, finishing second in NL MVP voting, behind Ken Caminiti. Piazza's best season with the Dodgers came in 1997, when he hit .362, with 40 home runs, 124 RBI, an on-base percentage of .431, and a slugging percentage of .638. He became the first catcher in MLB history to get 200 hits in a season. He finished second in NL MVP voting for the second straight year, behind Larry Walker.

=== Florida Marlins ===
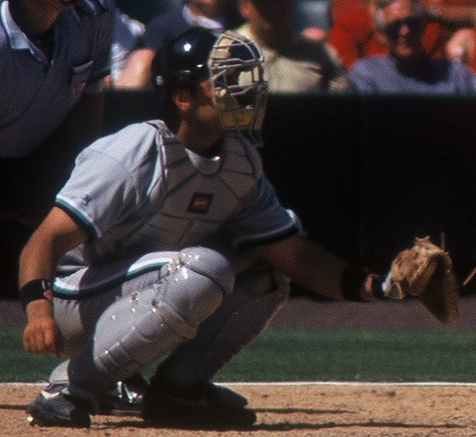
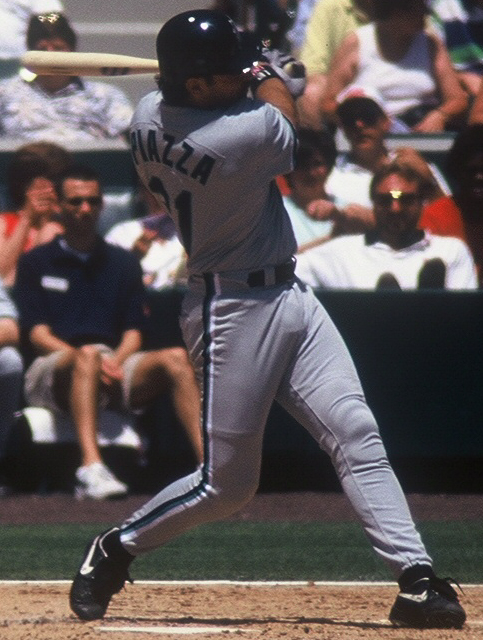
Piazza with the Marlins on May 18, 1998, three days after being traded by the Dodgers and four days before being traded to the Mets

During the 1997-98 offseason, Piazza wanted a new contract prior to his eligibility for arbitration; Piazza wanted $105 million for seven years while the Dodgers offered $76 million for six years. Piazza blasted the Dodgers when his demands were criticized by fans and the media, blaming Vin Scully in particular.

On May 15, 1998, the Dodgers traded Piazza and Todd Zeile to the Marlins in return for Gary Sheffield, Charles Johnson, Bobby Bonilla, Manuel Barrios, and Jim Eisenreich. He appeared in five games with the Marlins, where he hit .278.

=== New York Mets ===
On May 22, the Marlins traded Piazza to the New York Mets for Preston Wilson, Ed Yarnall, and Geoff Goetz. Piazza finished the 1998 season batting .328 with 32 home runs and 111 RBI, becoming the first player in MLB history to hit more than 30 home runs in a season while playing at least one game for three different franchises.

Piazza helped the Mets to two consecutive playoff appearances in 1999 and 2000. In the former season, Piazza tied his career highs of 40 home runs and 124 RBI. He also set the record for most home runs in a season without ever hitting more than one in a game, passing a mark previously set by Rogers Hornsby in 1929.

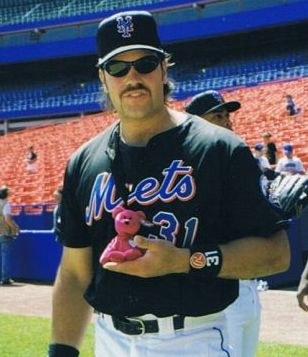
Piazza with the Mets in May 1999

The following year, Piazza led the Mets to an NL pennant and a World Series appearance in the 2000 Subway Series. He became known as "The Monster" after coach John Stearns was caught on tape during the 2000 National League Championship Series after a Piazza hit saying "The Monster is out of the Cage".

Piazza was involved in a bizarre incident during the 2000 World Series. Earlier in the season during interleague play, Yankees pitcher Roger Clemens hit Piazza in the head with a fastball. Piazza suffered a concussion and was forced to miss the 2000 MLB All-Star Game. Clemens was widely criticized by Mets fans for the incident, but Clemens maintained that the pitch was not intentional. Clemens and Piazza would go on to face each other again in the first inning of World Series Game 2. During the at-bat, Clemens threw a pitch that broke Piazza's bat as he fouled it off, sending the barrel and a sharp edge of the broken bat directly at Clemens on the mound just as he finished his delivery. Clemens caught the barrel and threw it across the first base line towards the Yankees' dugout and just past Piazza who was running down to first. Piazza gave a long stare at Clemens and slowly started walking towards Clemens to confront him, and Clemens asked the umpire for a new ball as if nothing had happened. During replays, Clemens can be seen shouting "I thought it was the ball!" and asking the umpire for a new ball multiple times as the two benches cleared and met at the mound. Words were exchanged between the two players, but no punches were thrown from either team and nobody was ejected. Piazza later caught for Clemens when both were on the NL team in the 2004 All-Star Game. Clemens gave up six runs in the first inning.

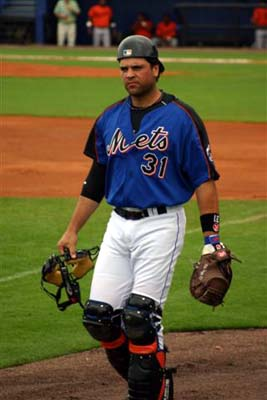
Piazza in 2004

Piazza's game-winning 8th-inning home run in the first professional baseball game played in New York following the 9/11 attacks has been called iconic, therapeutic, and symbolic. The jersey he wore in that September 21, 2001 game was purchased in April 2016 for $365,000, the highest price ever paid for a modern-day jersey, and is displayed on a rotating basis among the 9/11 Memorial Museum, Citi Field, and the National Baseball Hall of Fame.

To ease the stress on his deteriorating knees, Piazza began to split his time between catching and playing first base during the 2004 season, an experiment which was abandoned before the end of the season because of Piazza's defensive deficiencies. In addition to being recognized as a great hitter, Piazza has had some notable defensive accomplishments. Among them, Piazza caught two no-hitters thrown by Ramón Martínez and Hideo Nomo while playing with the Dodgers. Nomo's was particularly impressive because it happened at Coors Field, notorious for being a hitter-friendly ballpark. Additionally, Piazza's .997 fielding percentage was the highest among NL catchers in 2000.

On May 5, 2004, Piazza surpassed Carlton Fisk for most home runs by a catcher with his 352nd.

=== San Diego Padres ===
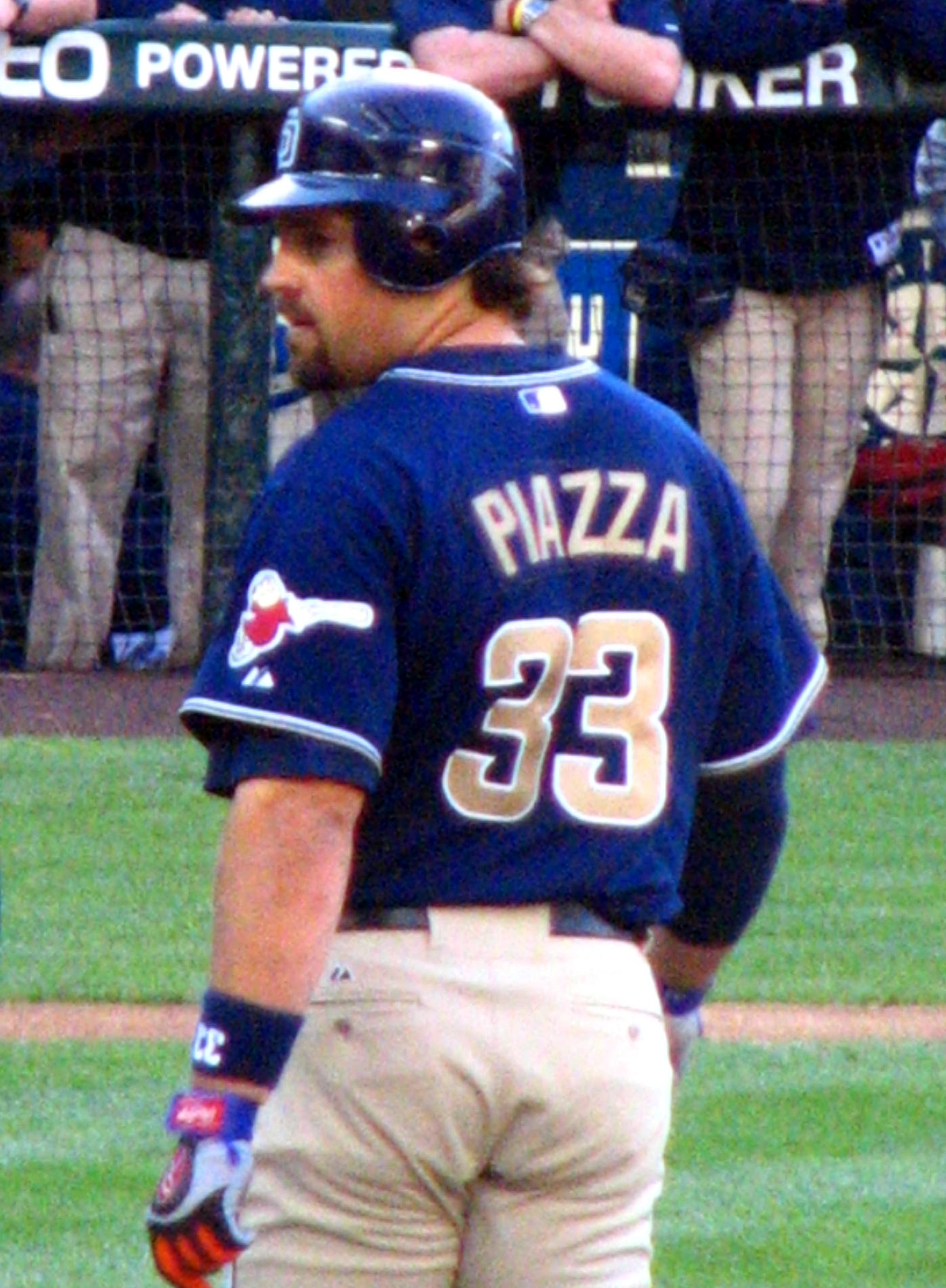
Piazza wearing No. 33 with San Diego in 2006

Following the 2005 season, Piazza signed a one-year contract worth $2 million with the San Diego Padres on January 29, 2006.

Serving as the Padres' starting catcher and clean-up hitter, Piazza experienced somewhat of a rejuvenation in 2006, batting .283 with 22 homers and helping the Padres to a division title. On July 21, 2006, Piazza collected his 2,000th career hit.

On August 8, 2006, Piazza played his first game at Shea Stadium since leaving the Mets. Throughout the three-game series, Piazza drew frequent standing ovations from New York fans. It was on par with that of Tom Seaver on his return to pitch at Shea Stadium in 1977 and 1978. Even more telling was during that series, on August 9, he drew a rare curtain call in the opposing park following a home run off Mets pitcher (and former Dodgers and Mets teammate) Pedro Martínez in the fourth inning. Not done for the day, Piazza went deep off Martinez again in the sixth. With the Mets ahead 4–2 in the eighth, and two runners aboard, Piazza hit one to the wall in center, nearly bashing his third homer of the day and putting the Padres ahead.

=== Oakland Athletics ===
Piazza signed as a free agent with the Oakland Athletics for $8.5 million on December 8, 2006. He exclusively played at designated hitter with the Athletics.

On July 25, 2007, in the top of the ninth inning in a game between the Angels and Athletics at Angel Stadium, a fan threw a water bottle that hit Piazza, who had homered earlier in the game. Piazza pointed his bat in the stands at the fan he believed threw the water bottle to get the attention of security. The fan, who was identified as Roland Flores from La Puente, California, was arrested by the ballpark security. Piazza pressed charges against Flores, and Flores was sentenced to 30 days in jail and three years of probation on March 27, 2008. On September 26, against the Boston Red Sox at Fenway Park, Piazza hit his 427th and what would be his final major league home run of his career, off of rookie pitcher Jon Lester.

After not being signed to any MLB team for the 2008 season, Piazza announced his retirement on May 20, 2008, saying, "After discussing my options with my wife, family, and agent, I felt it is time to start a new chapter in my life. It has been an amazing journey."

=== Retirement ===
Piazza returned to Shea Stadium during the "Shea Goodbye" closing ceremony on September 28, 2008, where he received the final pitch in the history of the stadium from Hall of Famer Tom Seaver. Piazza and Seaver also officially "closed" Shea by walking together into the center field exit, waving goodbye to the capacity crowd, and closing the door on the park. On April 13, 2009, Piazza received the very first pitch in the new Citi Field from Seaver before the Mets' opening game against the Padres.

== International baseball ==
Before the 2006 MLB season, Piazza represented Italy in the 2006 World Baseball Classic.

Piazza was the Italy national baseball team's hitting coach at the 2009 and 2013 World Baseball Classic. He was an instructor for the Italian Baseball Academy when it won back-to-back European Baseball Championships in 2010 and 2012.

On November 13, 2019, Piazza announced that he would manage the Italy national baseball team in the 2020 European Baseball Championship and the 2021 World Baseball Classic. Due to the coronavirus pandemic and cancellation of the 2020 European Baseball Club competitions, Piazza's debut as manager was delayed. The team placed third at the 2021 European Baseball Championship.

Piazza managed Team Italy in the 2023 World Baseball Classic, leading them to a 2–2 finish in their pool. This secured second place in the pool and allowed them to face Japan's team in the quarterfinals, ultimately losing 9–3.

In January 2025, Piazza was succeeded as manager of the senior national team by Francisco Cervelli.

== Reggiana ==
In 2016, Piazza purchased a majority ownership stake of the third-division Italian soccer club A.C. Reggiana in Reggio Emilia, with an estimated investment of $3 million. His interest grew from his friendship with former Italian soccer player Maurizio Franzone.

After two seasons of ownership and a controversial playoff loss to Robur Siena (with a penalty called in the 96th minute) Piazza put the team up for sale. Finding no buyers, and faced with mounting costs, including rent, the club ceased operations in July 2018. In December 2018 the team declared bankruptcy for the third time in twenty years. Piazza and his wife had feuded with Luca Vecchi, then mayor of Reggio Emilia, during their time as owners of the club.

== Legacy ==
Mike Piazza's number 31 was retired by the New York Mets in 2016.

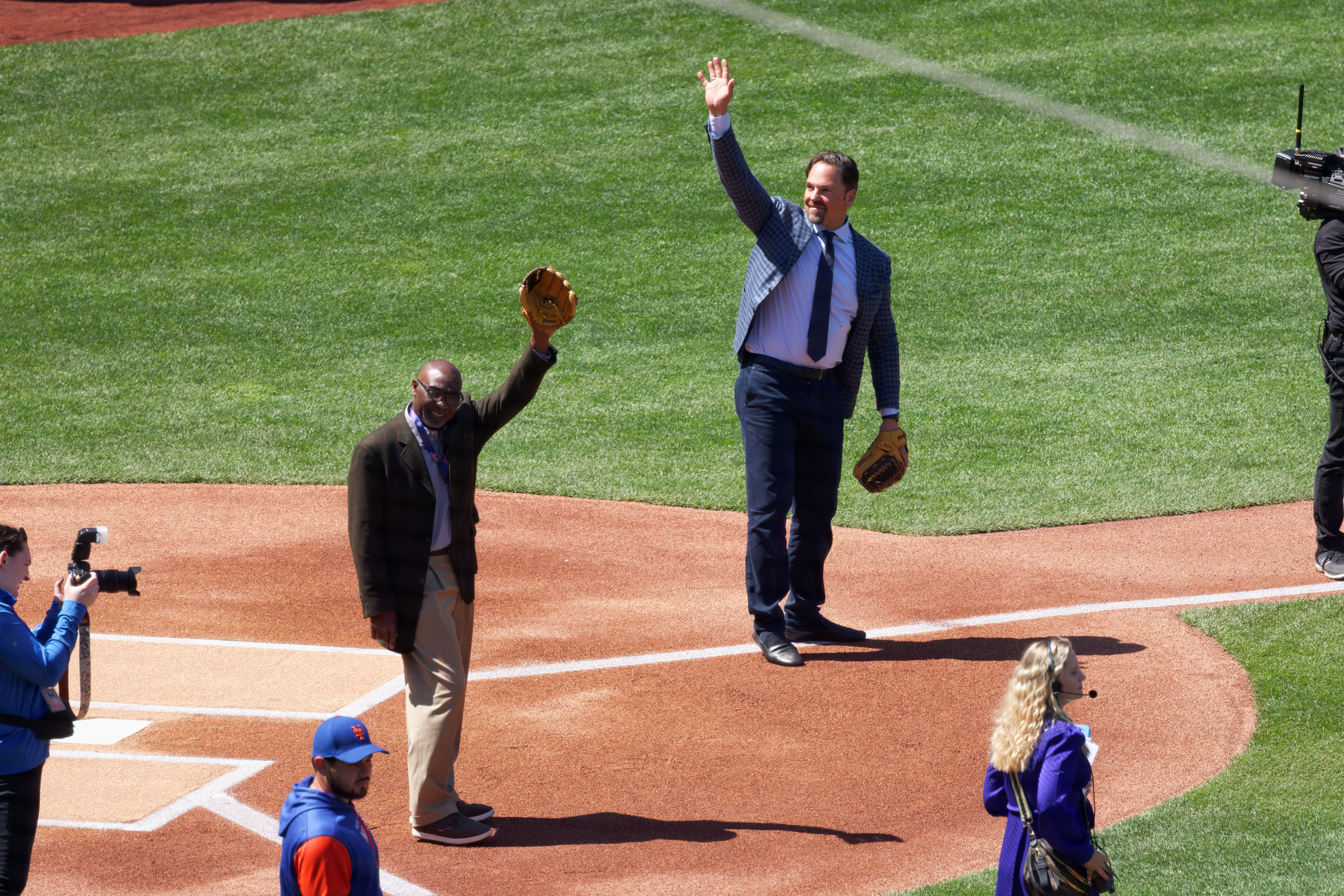
Piazza greets the crowd at Citi Field prior to catching a ceremonial pitch alongside Mookie Wilson.

In a sixteen-year major league career, Piazza played in 1,912 games, accumulating 2,127 hits in 6,911 at bats for a .308 career batting average along with 427 home runs, 1,335 runs batted in, an on-base plus slugging percentage of .922 and an on-base percentage of .377. Piazza is one of the best-hitting catchers of all time, hitting 427 career home runs, 396 of them while he was playing the catcher position, a Major League Baseball record for career home runs by a catcher. Only eight other players have ever had over 400 home runs with over a .300 lifetime average while never striking out more than 100 times in a season (Ted Williams, Stan Musial, Lou Gehrig, Mel Ott, Hank Aaron, Babe Ruth, Vladimir Guerrero and Chipper Jones). He is one of only three players in history to win ten Silver Slugger Awards, along with Barry Bonds and Alex Rodriguez.

In addition to his hitting, Piazza's defense has undergone a more positive reassessment in light of new defensive metrics. His pitch framing, in particular, ranks seventh-best among all catchers going back to the first data in 1988. Another report published in 2008 put him third among all catchers since 1948 in improving the performances of his pitchers.

Mets teammate Tom Glavine called Piazza a "first-ballot Hall of Famer, certainly the best hitting catcher of our era and arguably the best hitting catcher of all time". On May 8, 2010, while receiving an award, Piazza said to reporters that if he got into the Hall of Fame, he would like to be inducted as a Met, for whom he played seven-plus seasons.

Piazza managed the USA team in the 2011 futures game wearing a Mets cap to the event.

On January 9, 2013, Piazza failed to be elected to Baseball Hall of Fame, receiving only 57.8% of the votes and falling short of the 75% qualifying votes. He stated that he would address the performance-enhancing drugs and steroid rumors in his book Long Shot. In his second appearance on the ballot, Piazza's percentage numbers did rise (62.2%), but not to the 75% needed to be inducted. Piazza again failed to make the Hall of Fame in 2015, receiving 69.9% of the votes needed (28 votes shy of the mark). On January 6, 2016, Piazza was elected to the Baseball Hall of Fame, receiving 83% of the vote.

Piazza was inducted into the New York Mets Hall of Fame on September 29, 2013. The New York Mets retired his uniform number, 31, in a ceremony on July 30, 2016, prior to the Mets' game against the Colorado Rockies at Citi Field.

A triangular pennant bearing Piazza's surname and uniform number is in the background of character Peter Parker's bedroom in the 2019 film Spider-Man: Far From Home. The song 'Piazza, New York Catcher' by Scottish indie pop band Belle & Sebastian is about Piazza. Piazza's autobiography, entitled Long Shot, was released in February 2013.

== Acting ==
Piazza appeared in the movie Two Weeks Notice. He has acted in various TV shows and commercials. During the 1994–95 MLB strike, Piazza and a handful of other striking players appeared as themselves in the November 27, 1994, episode of Married... with Children.

On May 3, 2013, Piazza debuted with the Miami City Ballet, saying a few lines in the role of a hit man in the troupe's production of Slaughter on Tenth Avenue. Piazza sought to increase the reputation of ballet among sports fans after his daughter attended a ballet school.

In 2023, Piazza appeared on the Fox reality challenge series Special Forces: World's Toughest Test.

== Personal life ==
Piazza described Dodgers teammate Eric Karros as his "best friend in baseball."

On January 29, 2005, Piazza married actress and Playboy Playmate Alicia Rickter at St. Jude Catholic Church in Miami, Florida. Angelica Bridges was the maid of honor. Piazza and Rickter have three children.

Piazza is known to be a fan of heavy metal music and is featured on the album Stronger than Death by Black Label Society. He is also godfather to Zakk Wylde's son, Hendrix. He often cohosts Eddie Trunk's Friday Night Rocks show on WAXQ ("Q-104.3 FM") in New York City and was featured as the primary guest on an episode of That Metal Show. In 2003, Piazza made headlines when he was given a CD containing the song "I.R.S." by Guns N' Roses from their then-unreleased album Chinese Democracy and played it on Friday Night Rocks. He is also an accomplished drummer and has performed on stage with various bands.

Piazza is a devout Roman Catholic. His faith was instilled in him by his Catholic mother and was featured in Champions of Faith, a DVD documentary exploring the intersection of Catholic religious faith and sports. He also appeared in the follow-up video Champions of Faith: Bases of Life.

Piazza is also avidly involved in the National Italian American Sports Hall of Fame in Chicago.

== See also ==
- List of Major League Baseball home run records
- List of Major League Baseball career hits leaders
- List of Major League Baseball career home run leaders
- List of Major League Baseball career intentional bases on balls leaders
- List of Major League Baseball career OPS leaders
- List of Major League Baseball career putouts as a catcher leaders
- List of Major League Baseball career runs batted in leaders
- List of Major League Baseball career runs scored leaders
- List of Major League Baseball career slugging percentage leaders
- List of Major League Baseball individual streaks
- List of members of the Baseball Hall of Fame
- Los Angeles Dodgers award winners and league leaders
- Mike Piazza's Strike Zone
- New York Mets award winners and league leaders

| Preceded by Ellis Burks; Dante Bichette; Tony Gwynn; Barry Bonds | National League Player of the Month; May 1994; August 1995 (with Lenny Dykstra); June 1997; August 1997 | Succeeded by Jeff Bagwell; Dante Bichette; Barry Bonds; Mark McGwire |
