= Elsie Mae =

American singer

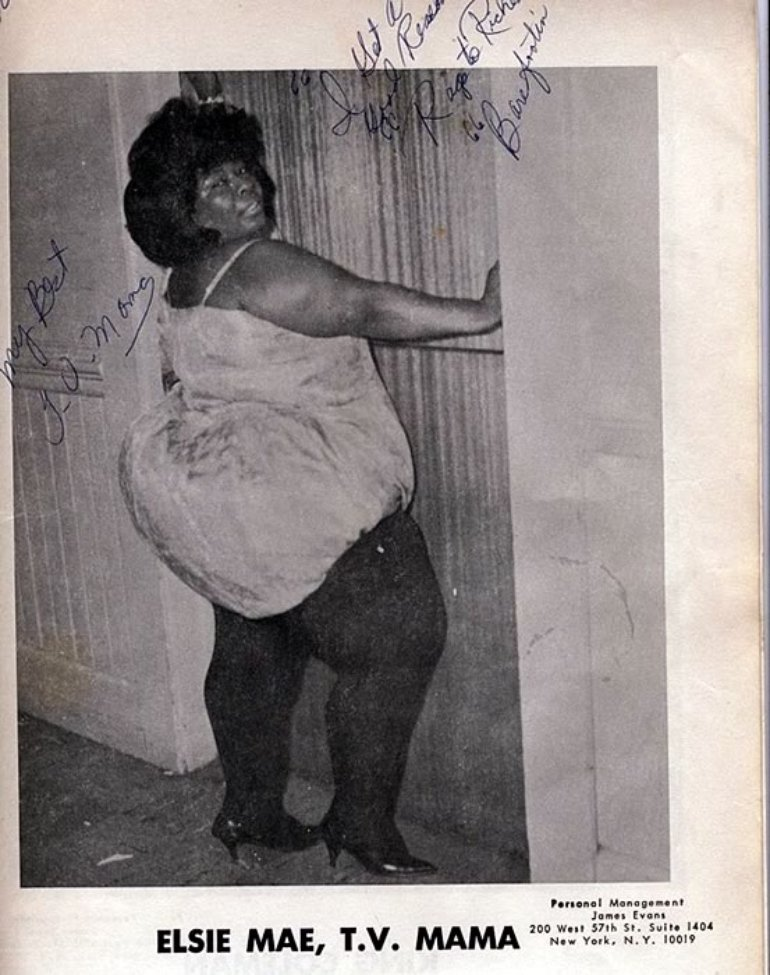

Elsie Mae worked as an American singer in James Brown’s backup band in the late 1960s.

She recorded a number of songs as a backup singer and a few songs herself, which among others can be found on the James Brown produced album James Brown's Original Funky Divas.

== Biography ==
Elsie Mae was nicknamed "T.V. Mama," although she never recorded the song. She was described as “a lady of ample proportions (who) preceded the sexy soul sistas of the ‘70s by being a sassy soul diva of the ‘60s.”

She recorded only two blues numbers under her own name. These were "Do You Really Want To Rescue Me" (1966) and previously "All of Me" (1964).

== Discography ==
- James Brown's Original Funky Divas (1998), Polydor Records CD release
