= The Butch Cassidy Sound System =

Alias used by Michael Hunter

The Butch Cassidy Sound System is an alias used by the UK's Michael Hunter who has composed music for the Grand Theft Auto computer games San Andreas and IV. His rendition of the song "Cissy Strut" featured in series 4, episode 14 of the BBC TV show Waterloo Road, and has been featured on a compilation album compiled by Belle & Sebastian. The song "The Putney" was featured in Babylon Central, a film written and directed by Eric Hilton of Thievery Corporation. Echo Tone Defeat, the follow-up album to the debut Butches Brew, was released in 2012. He also records under the pseudonym Pablo.
