= Girls in Peacetime Want to Dance =

Studio album by Belle and Sebastian
- Released: 19 January 2015
- Recorded: 2014
- Studio: Maze Studios, Atlanta, Georgia
- Genre: Indie pop
- Length: 61:16
- Label: Matador
- Producer: Ben H. Allen III

Belle and Sebastian chronology
The Third Eye Centre (2013)	Girls in Peacetime Want to Dance (2015)	How to Solve Our Human Problems (2018)

Singles from Girls in Peacetime Want to Dance
- 1. "The Party Line" Released: 2014; 2. "Nobody's Empire" Released: 2015; 3. "The Cat with the Cream" Released: 2015

Girls in Peacetime Want to Dance is the ninth studio album by Scottish indie pop band Belle and Sebastian, released on 19 January 2015. It was the first album by the group to be distributed by Matador Records worldwide. The album was recorded in Atlanta, Georgia, in 2014, and marked the first time the band worked with producer Ben H. Allen III. "The Party Line" was announced as the first single from the album on 29 October 2014, with its first airplay on BBC 6 Music.

The album reached number nine on the UK Albums Chart and number 28 on the US Billboard 200.

== Reception ==
Professional ratings
Aggregate scores
Source	Rating
AnyDecentMusic?	7.2/10
Metacritic	76/100
Review scores
Source	Rating
AllMusic	4/5 stars
The A.V. Club	B+
Entertainment Weekly	A−
The Guardian	4/5 stars
The Independent	4/5 stars
Los Angeles Times	3/4 stars
NME	7/10
Pitchfork	6.6/10
Rolling Stone	3/5 stars
Spin	7/10

On review aggregator website Metacritic, the album has a weighted average score of 76 out of 100 based on reviews from 36 critics, indicating "generally favorable reviews". Highlighting the group's increased sense of rhythm and attention to dance music, Stephen Carlick of Exclaim! wrote that "Girls in Peacetime Want to Dance is a statement record that Belle and Sebastian are still expert songwriters, with more than a few musical cards left to play."

== Track listing ==
All tracks are written by Belle & Sebastian, all lead vocals by Stuart Murdoch except where noted.

No.	Title	Lead vocals	Length
1.	"Nobody's Empire"		5:08
2.	"Allie"		3:16
3.	"The Party Line"		4:14
4.	"The Power of Three"	Sarah Martin	3:57
5.	"The Cat with the Cream"		5:17
6.	"Enter Sylvia Plath"	Murdoch and Martin	6:48
7.	"The Everlasting Muse"	Murdoch and Martin	5:25
8.	"Perfect Couples"	Stevie Jackson with Martin	5:29
9.	"Ever Had a Little Faith?"		4:21
10.	"Play for Today"	Murdoch and Dee Dee Penny	7:33
11.	"The Book of You"	Martin	4:23
12.	"Today (This Army's for Peace)"		5:25

=== 4-LP box set track listing ===
==== Disc One: The Party Line ====
Side 1
No.	Title	Length
1.	"The Party Line"	4:10

Side 2
No.	Title	Length
1.	"The Everlasting Muse"	5:21
2.	"The Power of Three"	3:54
3.	"Today (This Army's for Peace)"	5:24

==== Disc Two: Enter Sylvia Plath ====
Side 1
No.	Title	Length
1.	"Enter Sylvia Plath"	6:51

Side 2
No.	Title	Length
1.	"Born to Act" (bonus track)	3:08
2.	"Two Birds" (bonus track)	3:45
3.	"Ever Had a Little Faith?" (extended version)	7:48

==== Disc Three: Play for Today ====
Side 1
No.	Title	Length
1.	"Play for Today"	7:33

Side 2
No.	Title	Length
1.	"Nobody's Empire"	5:07
2.	"Piggy in the Middle" (bonus track)	4:18
3.	"The Book of You"	4:19

==== Disc Four: Perfect Couples ====
Side 1
No.	Title	Length
1.	"Perfect Couples" (extended version)	7:48

Side 2
No.	Title	Length
1.	"Allie"	3:15
2.	"A Politician's Silence" (bonus track)	5:41
3.	"The Cat with the Cream"	5:13

== Charts ==
Chart performance for Girls in Peacetime Want to Dance
Chart (2015)	Peak position
Australian Albums (ARIA)	57
Austrian Albums (Ö3 Austria)	28
Belgian Albums (Ultratop Flanders)	40
Belgian Albums (Ultratop Wallonia)	69
Dutch Albums (Album Top 100)	12
French Albums (SNEP)	49
German Albums (Offizielle Top 100)	30
Irish Albums (IRMA)	14
Italian Albums (FIMI)	86
New Zealand Albums (RMNZ)	24
Norwegian Albums (VG-lista)	23
Portuguese Albums (AFP)	17
Spanish Albums (Promusicae)	12
Swedish Albums (Sverigetopplistan)	31
UK Albums (Official Charts)	9
US Billboard 200	28
US Top Alternative Albums (Billboard)	7
US Top Rock Albums (Billboard)	8
