= Books (EP) =

2004 EP by Belle & Sebastian

EP by Belle and Sebastian
- Released: 21 June 2004
- Recorded: Sarm Hook End ("Wrapped Up in Books")
- Genre: Indie pop
- Length: 16:46
- Label: Rough Trade
- Producer: Trevor Horn ("Wrapped Up in Books"); Tony Doogan, B&S ("Your Cover's Blown"/"Your Secrets"); Chris Geddes ("Cover (Version)")

Belle and Sebastian chronology
This Is Just a Modern Rock Song (1998)	Books (2004)	Introducing... Belle & Sebastian (2008)

Professional ratings
Review scores
Source	Rating
Allmusic	link
Pitchfork Media	(8.3/10) link

Books is an extended play (EP) by Scottish indie pop band Belle and Sebastian in 2004 on Rough Trade Records. The EP features "Wrapped Up in Books" from Dear Catastrophe Waitress (2003), two new songs—"Your Cover's Blown" and "Your Secrets"—and "Cover (Version)", a remix of "Your Cover's Blown" by the band's keyboardist Chris Geddes. The front cover features Alexandra Klobouk. The EP reached number 20 on the UK Singles Chart and number 46 in Ireland.

The Japanese release of the EP includes a Japanese version of "I'm a Cuckoo" and a version of the Young Marble Giants song "Final Day" (slower than the version released on the 2003 Rough Trade compilation Stop Me If You Think You've Heard This One Before) as the fifth and sixth tracks.

== Track listings ==
UK and European CD EP

1. "Your Cover's Blown" – 6:01
2. "Wrapped Up in Books" – 3:34
3. "Your Secrets" – 3:11
4. "Cover (Version)" – 4:00
5. "Wrapped Up in Books" (video)
6. "Wrapped Up in Books" (game)

UK 7-inch single

A. "Your Cover's Blown" – 6:01
AA. "Wrapped Up in Books" – 3:34

UK DVD single

1. "Your Cover's Blow" (comic strip gallery)
2. "Wrapped Up in Books" (video)
3. "Your Secrets" (audio) – 3:11
4. "Cover (Version)" (audio) – 4:00

== Personnel ==
- Frank Arkwright – mastering
- Belle & Sebastian – producer, design
- Susan Bohling – Cor Anglais
- Richard Colburn – director, writer
- Mick Cooke – director, writer
- Chris Cowie – oboe
- Chris "Big Dog" Davis – sax (tenor)
- Tony Doogan – producer
- Chris Geddes – director, writer, mixing
- Trevor Horn – producer
- Stevie Jackson – director, writer
- Bob Kildea – director, writer
- Andrea Kuypers – flute
- Sarah Martin – director, writer
- Julian Mendelsohn – engineer, mixing
- Stuart Murdoch – director, writer, photography, video director
- Philip Todd – sax (tenor)
- Mark Trayner – photography, back cover
- Phil Tyreman – assistant engineer
- Dan Vickers – mixing

== Charts ==
Chart (2004)	Peak position
Ireland (IRMA)	46
Scotland (OCC)	12
UK Singles (OCC)	20
UK Indie (OCC)	2

== Release history ==
Region	Date	Format(s)	Label(s)	Ref.
United Kingdom	21 June 2004	7-inch vinyl; CD	Rough Trade	
Japan	22 July 2004	Mini-album	Rough Trade; Reservoir	
Australia	26 July 2004	CD	Spunk	
