= Dear Catastrophe Waitress =

2003 studio album by Belle & Sebastian

Studio album by Belle & Sebastian
- Released: 6 October 2003
- Recorded: Summer 2003
- Studio: Sarm West (London)
- Genre: Baroque pop; indie pop; twee pop
- Length: 48:17
- Label: Rough Trade
- Producer: Trevor Horn

Belle & Sebastian chronology
Storytelling (2002)	Dear Catastrophe Waitress (2003)	Push Barman to Open Old Wounds (2005)

Singles from Dear Catastrophe Waitress
- 1. "Step into My Office, Baby" Released: 17 November 2003; 2. "I'm a Cuckoo" Released: 16 February 2004

Professional ratings
Aggregate scores
Source	Rating
Metacritic	79/100
Review scores
Source	Rating
AllMusic	4.5/5 stars
Blender	4/5 stars
Entertainment Weekly	C+
The Guardian	4/5 stars
Mojo	4/5 stars
NME	8/10
Pitchfork	7.5/10
Rolling Stone	3/5 stars
Spin	B+
Uncut	5/5 stars

Dear Catastrophe Waitress is the sixth studio album by the Scottish indie pop band Belle & Sebastian, released on 6 October 2003 on Rough Trade Records. It was produced by Trevor Horn.

"Stay Loose" was released to radio on 24 February 2004. The album was nominated for the 2004 Mercury Music Prize, while "Step into My Office, Baby" was shortlisted for an Ivor Novello Award for Best Song. As of 2007, Dear Catastrophe Waitress had sold 138,000 copies in the US.

== Recording ==
The producer Trevor Horn became a fan of Belle & Sebastian through his teenage daughter, and particularly admired the lyrics. When the band heard he was a fan, they invited him to produce their new album. They recorded traditionally, rehearsing extensively and then recording live rather than using overdubs. Horn, known for using electronic equipment to transform music, was seen as a surprising choice for Belle and Sebastian, who were described by the Guardian as "the last living purveyors of arts-and-crafts indie values".

== Track listing ==
Dear Catastrophe Waitress track listing
No.	Title	Length
1.	"Step into My Office, Baby"	4:12
2.	"Dear Catastrophe Waitress"	2:22
3.	"If She Wants Me"	5:05
4.	"Piazza, New York Catcher"	3:03
5.	"Asleep on a Sunbeam" (Sarah Martin and Stuart Murdoch on vocals)	3:22
6.	"I'm a Cuckoo"	5:26
7.	"You Don't Send Me"	3:08
8.	"Wrapped Up in Books" (Stuart Murdoch and Stevie Jackson on vocals)	3:34
9.	"Lord Anthony"	4:14
10.	"If You Find Yourself Caught in Love"	4:15
11.	"Roy Walker" (Stevie Jackson on vocals)	2:57
12.	"Stay Loose"	6:41
Total length:		48:17

== Charts ==
Chart performance for Dear Catastrophe Waitress
Chart (2003)	Peak position
Australian Albums (ARIA)	88
Dutch Albums (Album Top 100)	58
French Albums (SNEP)	76
German Albums (Offizielle Top 100)	64
Irish Albums (IRMA)	25
Italian Albums (FIMI)	46
Norwegian Albums (VG-lista)	10
Swedish Albums (Sverigetopplistan)	16
UK Albums (Official Charts)	21
US Billboard 200	84
