= The Life Pursuit =

Studio album by Belle and Sebastian
- Released: 6 February 2006
- Recorded: 2005
- Studio: The Sound Factory, Los Angeles, CA
- Genre: Indie pop; R&B; glam rock; funk
- Length: 49:21
- Label: Rough Trade
- Producer: Tony Hoffer

Belle and Sebastian chronology
If You're Feeling Sinister: Live at the Barbican (2005)	The Life Pursuit (2006)	The BBC Sessions (2008)

Singles from The Life Pursuit
- 1. "Funny Little Frog" Released: 16 January 2006; 2. "The Blues Are Still Blue" Released: 3 April 2006; 3. "White Collar Boy" Released: 26 June 2006

The Life Pursuit is the seventh studio album by Scottish indie pop band Belle & Sebastian. It was released in Europe on 6 February 2006 by Rough Trade Records and in North America on 7 February 2006 by Matador Records.

The models on the album cover are Alex Klobouk, Natasha Noramly, and Marisa Privitera.

== Release and reception ==
Professional ratings
Aggregate scores
Source	Rating
Metacritic	78/100
Review scores
Source	Rating
AllMusic	4/5 stars
The A.V. Club	A−
Entertainment Weekly	A−
The Guardian	3/5 stars
Mojo	4/5 stars
NME	8/10
Pitchfork	8.5/10
Rolling Stone	3/5 stars
Spin	B
Uncut	4/5 stars

The album earned the band its most successful chart performance yet, reaching #8 in the UK Album Chart and #65 on the Billboard 200 in the United States, selling 20,485 units in the first week. The Life Pursuit has been certified Silver in the UK. Lead single "Funny Little Frog" reached the top 20 of the UK Single Charts in January 2006, becoming the band's highest charting to date. "The Blues Are Still Blue" was released as the second single in April of that same year managing to peak inside the top 40. "White Collar Boy" was released as the last single in June peaking inside the top 50 of the same chart. "We Are the Sleepyheads" was used in MTV2 adverts and "To Be Myself Completely" was featured in MLB 2K6. In 2009, Pitchfork named the album the 86th greatest of the 2000s.

The Life Pursuit has sold 112,000 units in US.

== Track listing ==
All tracks are written by Belle & Sebastian.

No.	Title	Length
1.	"Act of the Apostle"	2:55
2.	"Another Sunny Day"	4:04
3.	"White Collar Boy"	3:20
4.	"The Blues Are Still Blue"	4:08
5.	"Dress Up in You"	4:23
6.	"Sukie in the Graveyard"	3:00
7.	"We Are the Sleepyheads"	3:33
8.	"Song for Sunshine"	4:06
9.	"Funny Little Frog"	3:08
10.	"To Be Myself Completely" (Stevie Jackson on vocals)	3:17
11.	"Act of the Apostle II"	4:20
12.	"For the Price of a Cup of Tea"	3:19
13.	"Mornington Crescent"	5:40

iTunes bonus tracks
No.	Title	Length
14.	"Blue Eyes of a Millionaire"	4:25
15.	"I Took a Long Hard Look"	3:36

== Charts ==
Chart performance for The Life Pursuit
Chart (2006)	Peak position
Australian Albums (ARIA)	45
Austrian Albums (Ö3 Austria)	56
Belgian Albums (Ultratop Flanders)	41
Belgian Albums (Ultratop Wallonia)	86
Canadian Albums (Billboard)	47
Dutch Albums (Album Top 100)	32
Finnish Albums (Suomen virallinen lista)	25
French Albums (SNEP)	72
German Albums (Offizielle Top 100)	35
Irish Albums (IRMA)	23
Italian Albums (FIMI)	56
Norwegian Albums (VG-lista)	16
Spanish Albums (Promusicae)	46
Swedish Albums (Sverigetopplistan)	20
Swiss Albums (Schweizer Hitparade)	56
UK Albums (Official Charts)	8
US Billboard 200	65
US Independent Albums (Billboard)	3
