= Stuart Murdoch (musician) =

British musician

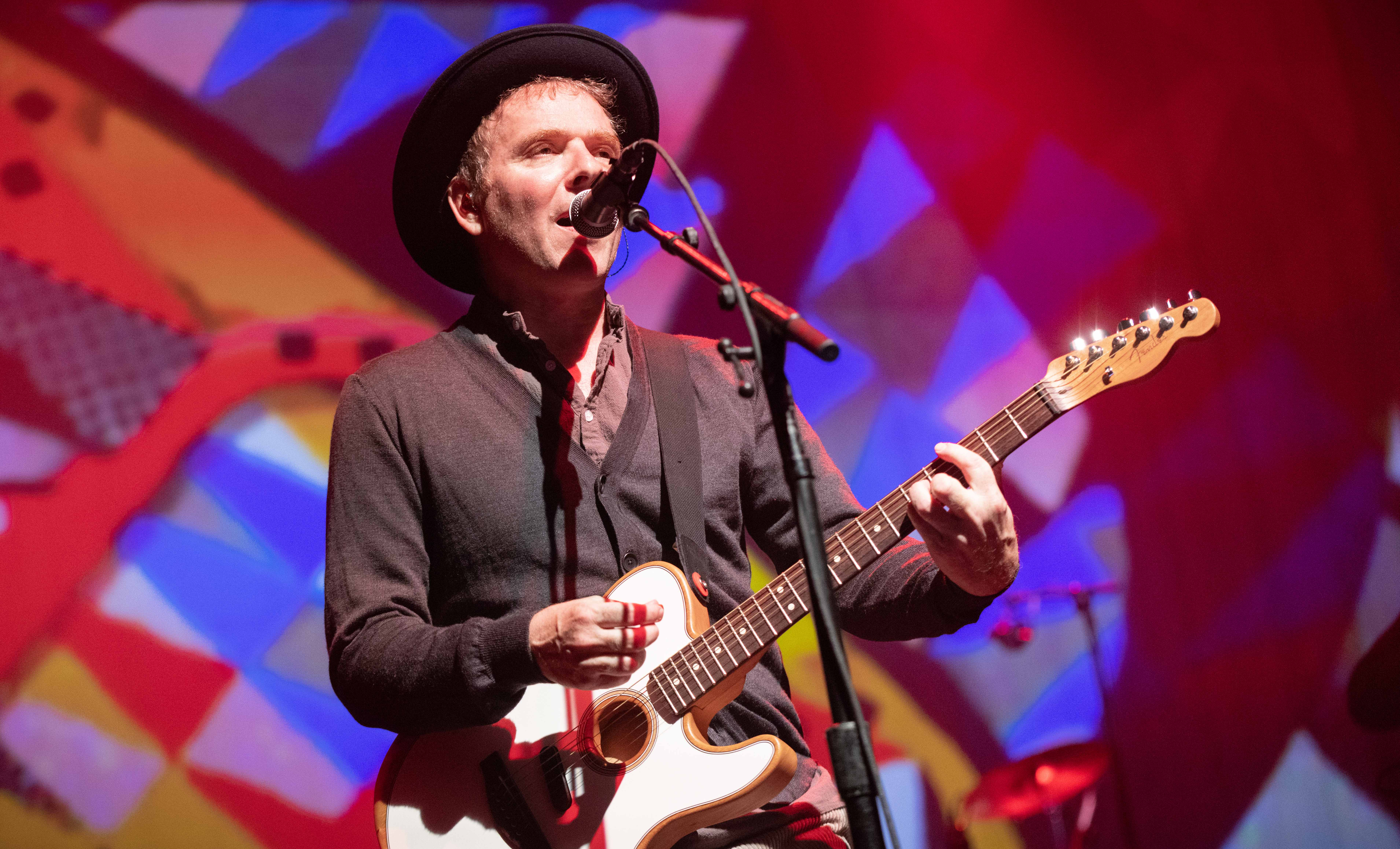
- Murdoch performing at the Palace Theatre in Saint Paul, Minnesota, 2022

Background information
- Also known as: Stewpot
- Born: Stuart Lee Murdoch; 25 August 1968 (age 58); Eastwood, Renfrewshire, Scotland
- Origin: Clarkston, Renfrewshire, Scotland
- Genre: Indie pop
- Occupation: Musician
- Instruments: Vocals; guitar; piano; keyboard
- Member of: Belle and Sebastian
- Formerly of: God Help the Girl

Stuart Lee Murdoch (born 25 August 1968) is a Scottish musician, writer and filmmaker, and the lead singer and songwriter for the indie pop band Belle and Sebastian.

== Early life ==
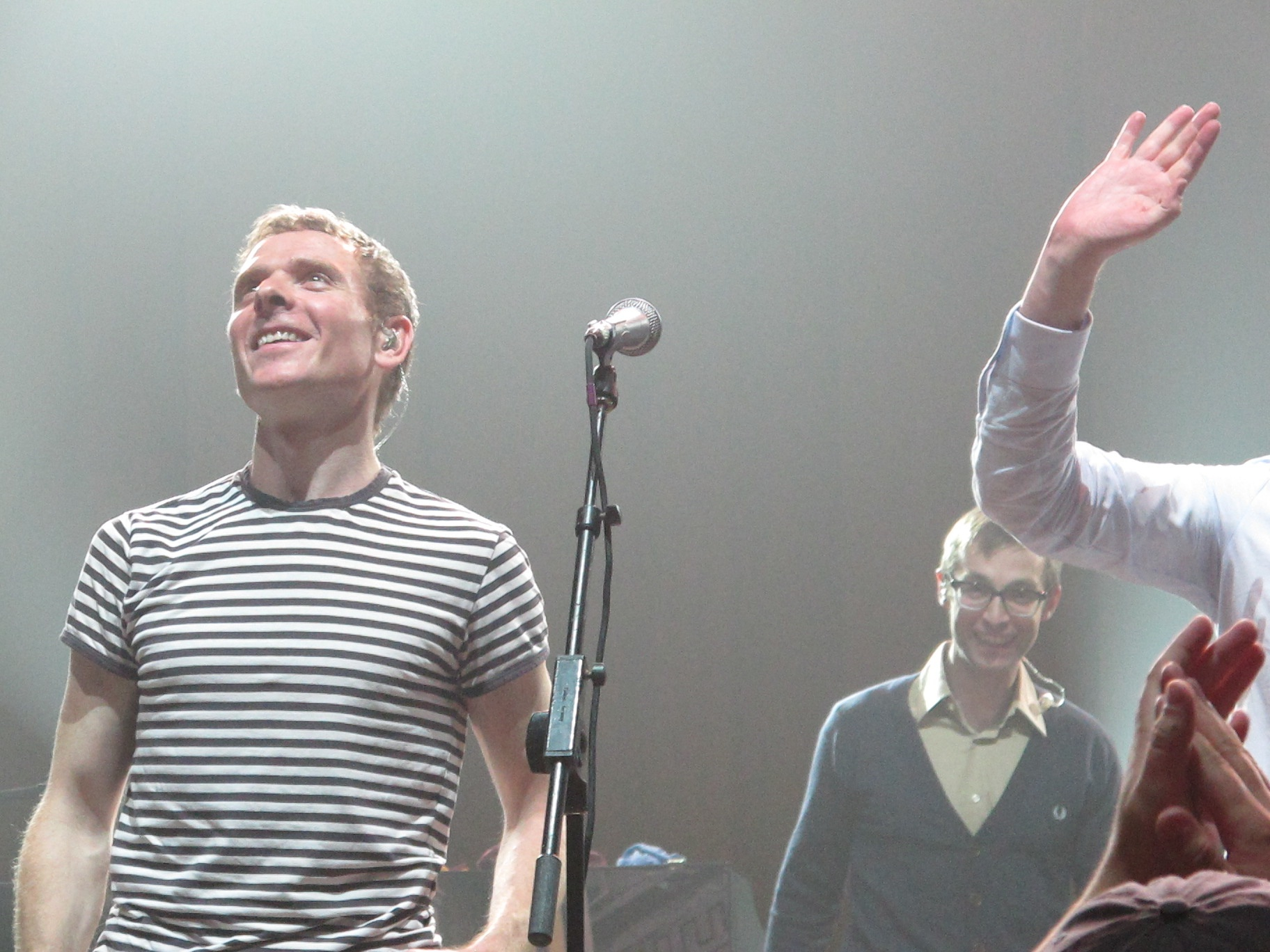
Murdoch with Belle and Sebastian at the Wang Theatre in Boston, 2010

Murdoch attended Belmont Academy in Ayr from 1980–1985.

Murdoch's parents made him take piano lessons during his childhood, and he claims not to have enjoyed them at the time but now "appreciates this decision vastly". Apart from early musical activities at secondary school (at age 12 he formed a band with fellow pupils, in which he played piano), Murdoch first became publicly involved in music as a radio DJ for Subcity Radio at the University of Glasgow.

While at university at the end of the 1980s, he became ill with myalgic encephalomyelitis, or chronic fatigue syndrome, and was unable to work for seven years. Murdoch said that the isolation of these years led to his becoming a songwriter: "That was a big desert at the time, a kind of vacuum in my life. From that, these songs started coming out, these melodies where I could express what I was feeling." By early 1995 Murdoch had largely recovered from his illness and began to look for fellow musicians to form a band, which became Belle & Sebastian. Murdoch's struggle with chronic fatigue syndrome is the subject of the song "Nobody's Empire" on Belle & Sebastian's album Girls in Peacetime Want to Dance.

== Influence of religion ==
This was also when he began living above a church hall and working as its caretaker, a position he maintained until 2003. In 2004 Murdoch told The Guardian, "I'm not actually a Christian with a capital C. I'm still asking questions. But I had this time when I found myself singing all these old hymns in my kitchen and I couldn't work out why I was doing it. Then one Sunday morning I got up, looked at my watch, and thought, 'I wonder if I could make it to a church service?' It was so welcoming. It just felt like you were coming home. Twelve years later, I've never left".

Murdoch's interest in faith has been perceptible in his lyrics. Belle and Sebastian's first album included lines about "reading the Gospel to yourself," and on the second Murdoch sang of "the pain of being a hopeless unbeliever." Religious references became more confident and direct on later albums, including "If You Find Yourself Caught in Love" (which continues "say a prayer to the man above"; this line becomes a refrain) on the album Dear Catastrophe Waitress and the two-part "Act of the Apostle" on The Life Pursuit. Of "If You Find Yourself Caught in Love," Murdoch told Gross, "At the time I was writing it I thought, well, should I be so overt? Because I've often couched any religious overtones within characters in the past, but this is a bit more out there. And then I just thought, come on, you've been doing this for years, why not? Why not just be a bit more straightforward?"

== Personal life ==
- Murdoch ran the Glasgow Marathon in 1986, and finished with a time of 2:57:08.
- Murdoch was an extra in the 1996 film Trainspotting featuring as a man in a bar in the background of a scene.
- He married longtime girlfriend Marisa Privitera on 26 November 2007 in New York City. Privitera is on the cover of Belle and Sebastian's DVD Fans Only and LP The Life Pursuit. Their eldest son, Denny (named after his goddaughter), was born in May 2013. Their second son Nico was born in November 2016.
- Murdoch is a fan of American baseball, in particular the New York Mets and Hall of Fame catcher Mike Piazza, whom he wrote about in "Piazza, New York Catcher".
- Murdoch is a fan of Scottish football team Ayr United.
- Murdoch dated Tracyanne Campbell, the lead singer of the band Camera Obscura, for three years in the 2000s.
- Murdoch was diagnosed with colour blindness at an early age.
- In 2009, Murdoch contributed the song "Another Saturday" to the AIDS benefit album Dark Was the Night, produced by the Red Hot Organization. He was one of the most notable protesters attending a 5 December 2009 march in Glasgow supporting governmental intervention to combat climate change, prior to the United Nations Climate Change Conference 2009 in Copenhagen.
- In 2010 Murdoch published his first memoir, The Celestial Café. In 2012–2013 he wrote and directed the musical feature film God Help the Girl, released internationally and online in 2014. When talking about his life experience, he stated, "I realized pretty fast San Francisco is my kind of town."
- Murdoch has been diagnosed with Myalgic encephalomyelitis/chronic fatigue syndrome (ME/CFS).
- Sexually ambiguous lyrics in Belle & Sebastian's music have prompted Murdoch to confirm his heterosexuality in the press, calling himself "straight to the point of boring myself".
- In 2024, Murdoch published his second book, Nobody's Empire, a novel.
