= Teenage Dream (disambiguation) =

Teenage Dream is a 2010 studio album released by American singer-songwriter Katy Perry.

Teenage Dream may also refer to:

== Music ==
=== Albums ===
- Teenage Dream (IQU album), 2000
- Teenage Dream, a 1990 EP by Thrilled Skinny
- Teenage Dream a 1998 album by Michiyo Heike
- Teenage Dreams, a 2005 album by Daniel O'Donnell

=== Songs ===
- "Teenage Dream" (T. Rex song), 1974
- "Teenage Dream" (Katy Perry song), 2010
- "Teenage Dream", a 1957 song by Terry Dene
- "Teenage Dreams", a 1960 song by Dave Sampson
- "Teenage Dream", a 1974 song by The Rubettes from Wear It's 'At
- "Teenage Dream", a 1982 song by The Damned from the "Lively Arts" single
- "Teenage Dream", a 1992 song by Mr. Children from Kind of Love
- "Teenage Dream", a 1994 song by Seikima-II from Ponk!!
- "Teenage Dream", a 1995 song by Deen
- "TeenageDream", a 2012 song by Mykki Blanco from Cosmic Angel: The Illuminati Prince/ss
- "Teenage Dream", a 2023 song by Olivia Rodrigo from Guts

== Other uses ==
- Flying (film) (1986), released on video as Teenage Dream, a drama film directed by Paul Lynch

== See also ==
- Teen Dream (disambiguation)
