= IQU =

- Also known as: ICU
- Origin: Olympia, Washington, United States
- Genres: Lo-fi
- Years active: c.1997–present
- Labels: K, Sonic Boom
- Members: Michiko Swiggs; Kento Oiwa
- Past members: Aaron Hartman

IQU (pronounced 'ee-koo', and originally named ICU) is an American lo-fi music group from Olympia, Washington, United States.

== History ==
The band formed in Olympia, initially as ICU, and comprised Michiko Swiggs (keyboards), Aaron Hartman (bass), and K.O. (Kento Oiwa, guitar, theremin, turntables). Swiggs and Oiwa had met at a rave in Osaka, Japan. Their early recordings consisted of free-form improvisation, but became more song-based. They were signed by Calvin Johnson to his K Records label, releasing the album Chotto Matte A Moment! in 1998. The band's live shows included bills shared with Unwound, Sonic Youth, The Flaming Lips, Hovercraft, and Mouse on Mars, and the band toured extensively.

In 1999 the band issued the Girls on Dates EP, a collaboration with performance artist, poet, and filmmaker Miranda July, described by Allmusic as "a frightening mix of squealing low-fi electronics and broken verbal communication" and "a wonderfully provocative collaboration".

Their third album, Teenage Dream was released in 2000, featuring seven different mixes of "Teenage Dream" by the likes of Looper, Lexaunculpt and Sonic Boom, and two mixes of "Can't You Even Remember That?".

Hartman left in 2000, forming Old Time Relijun. Over the next few years, Oiwa scored the soundtrack for The Cabinet of Dr. Caligari and worked as a DJ, and Swiggs became more involved in visual arts.

Their fourth album, Sun Q, recorded as a duo, was released in 2004, and was regarded as their best yet by Allmusic, who described the album as "pretty, Asian flavored synth pop". Pitchfork Media described Sun Q as "a mash of styles that can be generally categorized as "alien pop" - mutated top 40, broken disco, and hyperactive glam instrumentals that flow along at a stream-of-consciousness pace".

== Discography ==
=== Albums ===
- Chotto Matte A Moment! (1998), K
- Teenage Dream (2000), K - IQU and friends
- Sun Q (2004), Sonic Boom

=== Singles, EPs ===
- Despite The Smell Of Colors, Vol I (1998), N.E.W.
- Girls on Dates EP (1999), K - with Miranda July
- Dirty Boy (2004), Sonic Boom
