= Up a Tree (album) =

Studio album by Looper
- Released: 8 March 1999
- Genre: Indie pop, electronica, folk hop
- Length: 39:08
- Label: Jeepster, Sub Pop
- Producer: Looper

Looper chronology
| Up a Tree (1999) | The Geometrid (2000) |

Singles from Up a Tree
- 1. "Ballad of Ray Suzuki" Released: 1999; 2. "Who's Afraid of Y2K? / Up a Tree Again" Released: 1999

Up a Tree is the debut studio album by Looper, released in 1999. It peaked at number 23 on the UK Independent Albums Chart, as well as number 79 on the Scottish Albums Chart.

== Critical reception ==
Professional ratings
Review scores
| Source | Rating |
|---|---|
| AllMusic | 2.5/5 stars |
| Pitchfork | 8.1/10 |

The Guardian wrote: "What initially seems like the usual mumbling and twee strummery gradually reveals drum'n'bass touches, the keyboard line from the Doors' 'LA Woman' and plinkety percussion loops."

== Track listing ==
| No. | Title | Length |
|---|---|---|
| 1. | "The Treehouse" | 1:27 |
| 2. | "Impossible Things #2" | 5:22 |
| 3. | "Burning Flies" | 3:54 |
| 4. | "Festival '95" | 4:51 |
| 5. | "Ballad of Ray Suzuki" | 4:41 |
| 6. | "Dave the Moon Man" | 5:11 |
| 7. | "Quiet and Small..." | 3:03 |
| 8. | "Columbo's Car" | 4:52 |
| 9. | "Up a Tree Again" | 3:43 |
| 10. | "Back to the Treehouse" | 2:04 |

== Charts ==
| Chart | Peak position |
|---|---|
| UK Independent Albums (OCC) | 23 |
| UK Scottish Albums (OCC) | 79 |
