= The Future (film) =

2011 film

- Theatrical release poster
- Directed by: Miranda July
- Written by: Miranda July
- Produced by: Gina Kwon; Roman Paul; Gerhard Meixner
- Starring: Miranda July; Hamish Linklater
- Cinematography: Nikolai von Graevenitz
- Edited by: Andrew Bird
- Music by: Jon Brion
- Production companies: The Match Factory; Medienboard Berlin-Brandenburg; Razor Film Produktion; GNK Productions; Film4; Haut et court
- Distributed by: Roadside Attractions (United States); Alamode Film (Germany)
- Release dates: January 21, 2011 (Sundance); July 29, 2011 (United States); October 27, 2011 (Germany)
- Running time: 90 minutes
- Countries: Germany; United States
- Language: English
- Budget: $1 million
- Box office: $887,172

The Future is a 2011 drama film written, directed by, and starring Miranda July. The Future made its world premiere at the 2011 Sundance Film Festival. The film was nominated for the Golden Bear at the 61st Berlin International Film Festival.

== Plot ==
Sophie and Jason are a couple in their 30s. Each works a dead-end job, he as a tech support agent and she as a children's dance instructor. Feeling stuck in their lives, they plan to adopt a cat expected to die within six months due to terminal disease.

At the vet's office, while Sophie is in the bathroom, Jason looks at amateur animal art for sale. He buys a drawing of a young girl holding a dog. The girl's parents, who are separated, wrote their phone numbers on the back of the drawing in case whoever buys it wants to return it.

The vet informs Sophie and Jason that if they take good care of the cat, it may live for up to five more years, but that they cannot take it home for another month because it is recovering from surgery. Sophie and Jason decide to spend the intervening time living as freely as possible, knowing that they are signing up to have a cat for much longer than they intended.

Both quit their jobs. Jason befriends an elderly man who has been with his wife for 62 years and tells Jason that the early part of a long relationship can be very difficult to navigate.

One day while Jason is out, Sophie gets bored and calls the number on the back of the drawing from the vet's office, striking up a conversation with Marshall, the girl's father. She visits him at home under the pretense of hiring him to design a sign for a dance performance she's developing, then returns another day and sleeps with him.

She attempts to confess her infidelity to Jason, who freezes time to stop her from continuing the conversation. He talks to the moon about living forever in that moment to preserve his relationship with Sophie, but the moon tells him that only his timeline is frozen—the rest of the world has moved forward. Later, he envisions himself controlling the night tides with the moon overhead. When morning arrives, he is simply standing on the beach, alone.

Sophie moves in with Marshall and gets a job as a secretary at the dance studio she had earlier quit. She runs into two friends her age who have become pregnant since she last saw them, then envisions their children growing up and having a child of their own, while her own life remains stalled.

Jason comes home one day to find Sophie lingering outside the door and tells her there is nothing there for her to come back to. They reveal to each other that they had separately attempted to adopt the cat, but learned that it had been euthanized because they didn't pick it up on time. Jason invites Sophie to spend a final night together.

== Cast ==
- Miranda July as Sophie
- Hamish Linklater as Jason
- David Warshofsky as Marshall
- Isabella Acres as Gabriella
- Joe Putterlik as Joe
- Angela Trimbur as Dance studio receptionist
- Mary Passeri as Animal shelter receptionist
- Kathleen Gati as Dr. Straus
- Erinn K. Williams as Tammy
- Oona Mekas as Sasha

== Background ==
The Future was born as a performance piece July had staged at The Kitchen and other venues in 2007.

== Reception ==
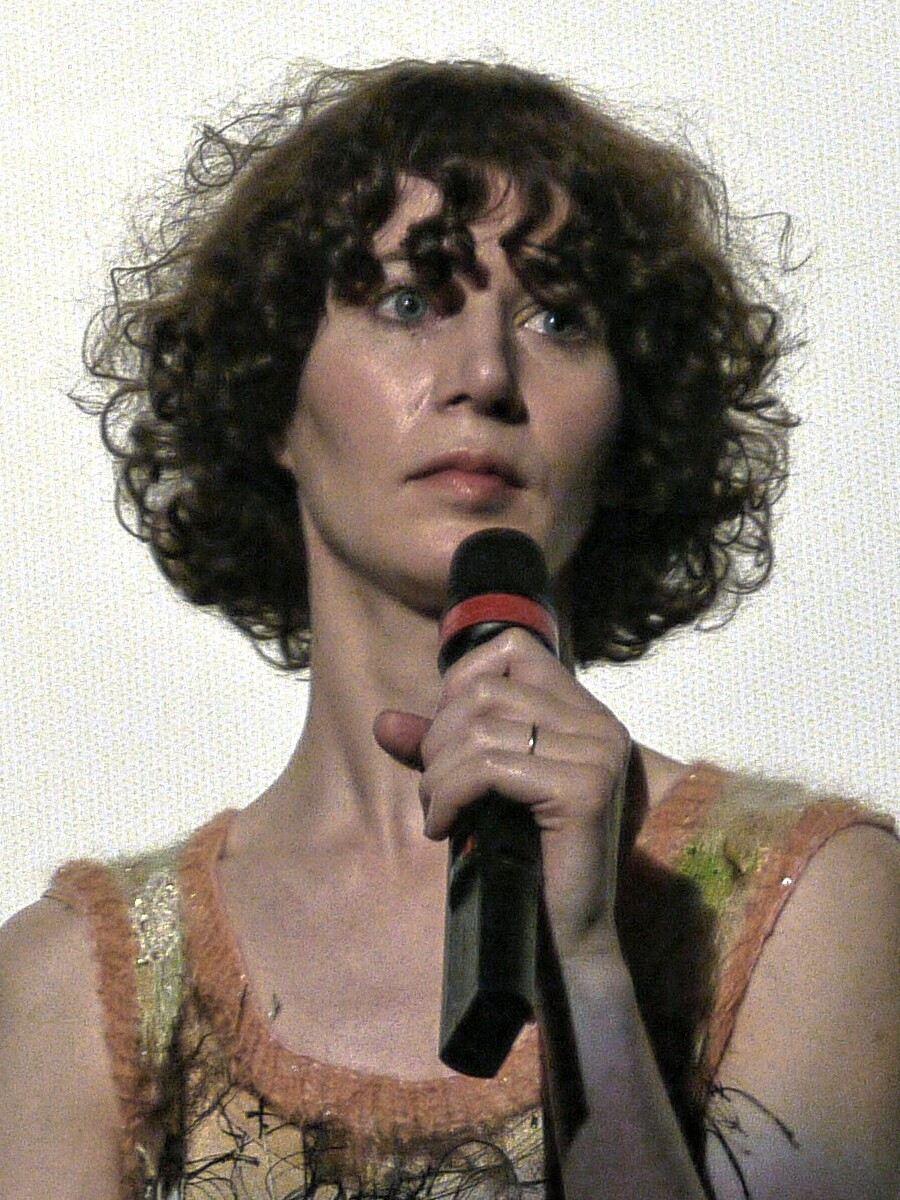
July promoting The Future in Paris in 2011.

The Future received generally positive reviews, holding a 71% "fresh" rating on Rotten Tomatoes; the consensus states "A dark and whimsical exploration of human existence that challenges viewers as much as it rewards them." On Metacritic, the film has a 67/100, indicating "generally favorable reviews". Film critic Richard Brody said that it "captures the stasis, the loneliness, the waste of an unrealized life spent in head-down pursuit" and called it a major work of art.

The film grossed $568,290 in the U.S. box office, against a $1 million budget.
