= Teenage Dream (IQU album) =

Remix album by IQU and friends
- Released: 2000
- Recorded: 2000
- Genre: Lo-fi music
- Length: 50:35
- Label: K

IQU and friends chronology
Chotto Matte a Moment! (1998)	Teenage Dream (2000)	Sun Q (2004)

Teenage Dream is a 2000 remix album by IQU, released on K Records. The album features the original version of the track "Teenage Dream" plus six remixes by artists such as Looper, Sonic Boom, and Lexaunculpt, and two mixes of "Can't You Even Remember That?", a track from the band's debut album Chotto Matte a Moment!.

== Track listing ==
All tracks written by Aaron Hartman/IQU.

1. "Teenage Dream" (original version) - 8:03
2. "Teenage Dream" (Looper mix) - 3:58 - remixed by Looper
3. "Teenage Dream" (Meek remix) - 4:12
4. "Teenage Dream" (Norowareta mix) - 4:28
5. "Teenage Dream" (Tokyo and Kids Dubbreaks mix) - 8:03 - remixed by Dub ID
6. "Teenage Dream" (A Dream Like I Never Had Before mix) - 4:21
7. "Teenage Dream" (Bad Blood mix) - 5:17
8. "Can't You Even Remember That?" (Q>C mix) - 6:19 - remixed by K.O.
9. "Can't You Even Remember That?" (Sonic mix) - 5:54 - remixed by Sonic Boom

== Critical reception ==
Professional ratings
Review scores
Source	Rating
Allmusic	3/5 stars
Pitchfork Media	(5.5/10)
PopMatters	(mixed)

Mark Richard-San of Pitchfork Media, while describing the original "Teenage Dream" track as "great" and stating that it "sums up everything that makes the band interesting in a single seven-minute track", was indifferent about the album. In his view: "Some of the mixes are decent, but most are average, at best," and he described the album as "one (great) new track and eight (okay) remixes". Heather Phares of Allmusic gave the album a three-star review, saying: "Though not all of the six other mixes of the song are illuminating, several of them are enjoyable". Geoff Stahl of PopMatters viewed the album similarly, stating: "There are versions here that close-in on interesting, but with a grating guitar riff which seems a bit to power-chordish for our own good, so that most of the remixes that dwell on it seem more disabled by rather than inspired," and finding the remixes of "Can't You Even Remember That?" "the most pleasing ones on offer".
