= All Fours (novel) =

2024 novel by Miranda July

- Author: Miranda July
- Publisher: Riverhead Books
- Publication date: May 14, 2024
- Publication place: United States
- Media type: Print (hardcover & paperback)
- Pages: 336
- ISBN: 9780593190265 (hardcover 1st ed.)
- OCLC: 1388498983
- LC Class: PS3610.U537 A79 2024

All Fours is a 2024 novel by Miranda July.

== Plot ==
The novel follows a 45-year-old perimenopausal woman who, after having an extramarital affair during a road trip, has a sexual awakening.

== Reception ==
The novel was shortlisted for the 2024 National Book Award for Fiction. It was listed as 2024 book of the year by Open Book (BBC Radio 4), The Observer, GQ, Grazia, I-D and Nylon magazine, among others.

== Adaptation ==
=== Television ===
In 2025, Starz announced plans to adapt the novel into a television series.
