= The Snare (album) =

Studio album by Looper
- Released: 2002
- Label: Mute
- Producer: Peacock Johnson

Looper chronology
The Geometrid (2000)	The Snare (2002)	Offgrid:Offline (2015)

The Snare is the third album by the Scottish band Looper, released in 2002. Frontman Stuart David adopted the persona of Peacock Johnson.

== Production ==
The album shares themes and characters with David's novel The Peacock Manifesto. "This Evil Love" is about romantic obsession. The music shifted from the dance styles of the first two albums to include downbeat and trip hop elements.

== Critical reception ==
Professional ratings
Aggregate scores
Source	Rating
Metacritic	51/100
Review scores
Source	Rating
AllMusic	2.5/5 stars
The Gazette	3.5/5 stars
NME	2/10
Pitchfork	6.1/10
Playlouder	4/5 stars
Q	3/5 stars
Uncut	6/10
Winnipeg Sun	4/5 stars

Pitchfork wrote: "Easy to dismiss, smirk at, or even hate on the first listen, nine out of The Snare's ten tracks are grind-and-pause, semi-sultry pairings of exotic keyboard settings and mid-tech beats that exploit their refrains and come weirdly close to the patterns of 'risqué' after-dinner radio pop circa 1999-present." Exclaim! determined that "as an isolated album it comes across as little more than sub-par art pop whose tunes are monotonous and whose lyrics are obtuse." The Gazette considered it "a dark, brooding work which holds together well, but struggles to free itself from its own weight."

The Sunday Herald deemed the album "10 menacing murder ballads, all characterised by ... dulcimer, baritone sax burps and tinkly music-box noises, backed by a Casio-keyboard approximation of the stuttering beats of modern R&B." The Northern Echo called it "a black masterpiece." The Philadelphia Daily News labeled it "a mysterious soundtrack of the mind with R&B, hip-hop and spaghetti western inflections."

AllMusic wrote that "Looper drops their bright playfulness for a sophisticated, darker counterpart which uses jazz, R&B, and trip-hop as its foundation."

== Track listing ==
No.	Title	Length
1.	"The Snare"
2.	"Sugarcane"
3.	"New York Snow"
4.	"Peacock Johnson"
5.	"Driving Myself Crazy"
6.	"Lover's Leap"
7.	"Good Girls"
8.	"She's a Knife"
9.	"This Evil Love"
10.	"Fucking Around"
