= Miranda July =

American artist (born 1974)

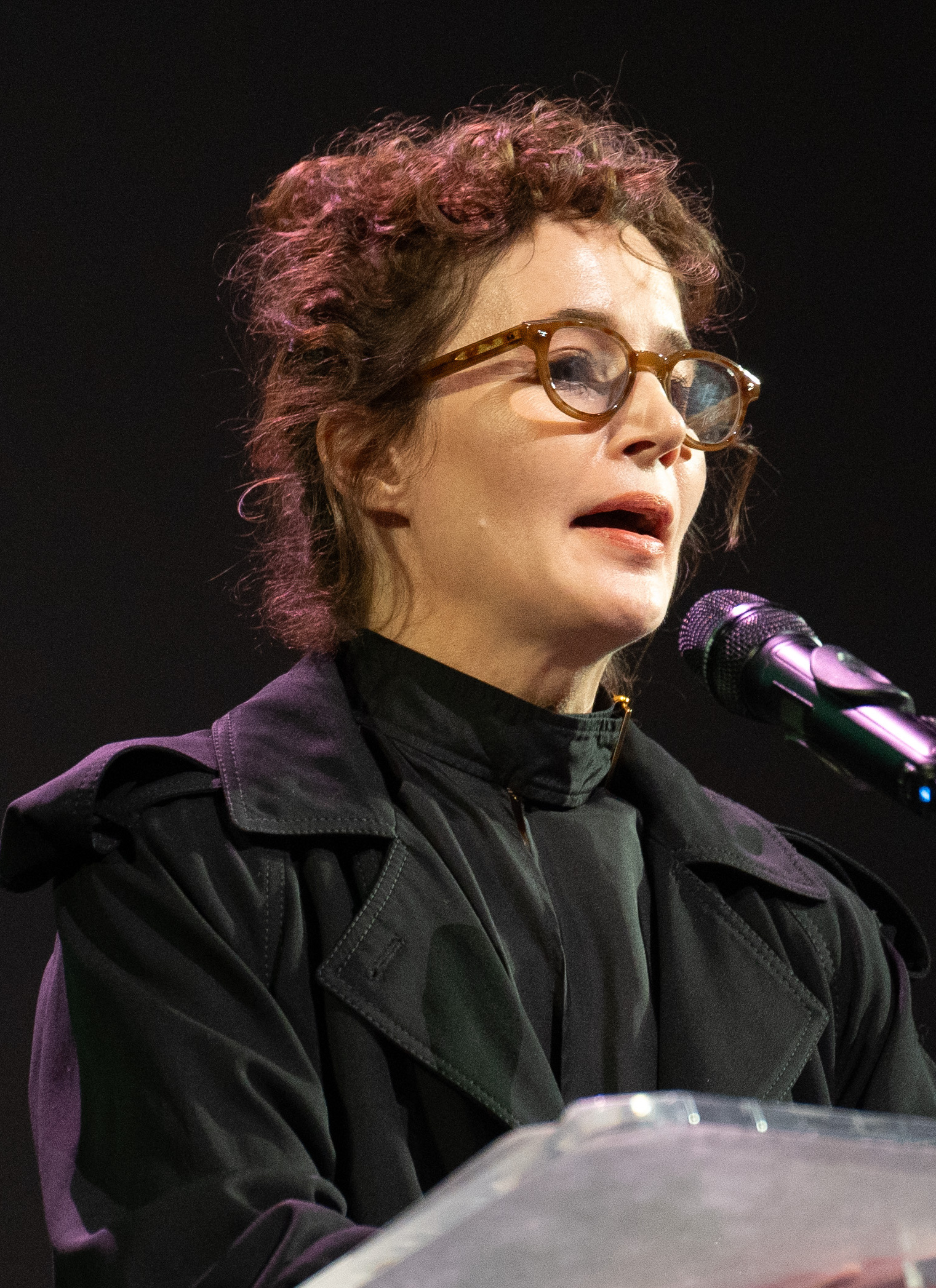
- July at 2024 National Book Awards finalist reading
- Born: Miranda Jennifer Grossinger; February 15, 1974 (age 52); Barre, Vermont, U.S.
- Occupations: Actress; filmmaker; author
- Spouse: Mike Mills (m. 2009; sep. 2022)
- Children: 1
- Parent(s): Lindy Hough; Richard Grossinger
- Relatives: Skylar Brandt (cousin)

Miranda July (born Miranda Jennifer Grossinger; February 15, 1974) is an American film director, screenwriter, actress and author. Her body of work includes film, fiction, monologue, digital presentations and live performance art.

She wrote, directed and starred in the films Me and You and Everyone We Know (2005) and The Future (2011) and wrote and directed Kajillionaire (2020). She has authored a book of short stories, No One Belongs Here More Than You (2007); a collection of nonfiction short stories, It Chooses You (2011); and the novels The First Bad Man (2015) and All Fours (2024).

== Early life ==
July was born in Barre, Vermont, in 1974, the daughter of Lindy Hough and Richard Grossinger. Her parents are both writers who taught at Goddard College at the time. They were also the founders of North Atlantic Books, a publisher of alternative health, martial arts, and spiritual titles. Her father was Jewish, and her mother was Protestant. Her family also dabbled in New Age religion and discussed spirituality while she was growing up.

July was encouraged to work on her short fiction by author Rick Moody. She was raised in Berkeley, California, where she first began staging plays at 924 Gilman Street, a local punk rock club. She attended The College Preparatory School in Oakland for high school. She describes the experience as overwhelming. As a teenager, July wrote and directed a play called The Lifers, which was based on her correspondence with a man incarcerated for murder. She went on to stage it in punk clubs. She later attended the film school at University of California Santa Cruz, but dropped out during her second year and moved to Portland, Oregon.

== Career beginnings ==
After relocating to Portland, Oregon, she began doing one-woman performance art shows. Her performances were successful. Portland is also where she began participating in the riot grrrl scene.

In the early stages of her film career, she created several small video projects and performances years prior to her debut feature film, Me and You and Everyone We Know. During this time, July also worked as a waitress, a tastemaker for Coca-Cola, a locksmith, and a stripper.

== Film ==
=== Joanie4Jackie ===
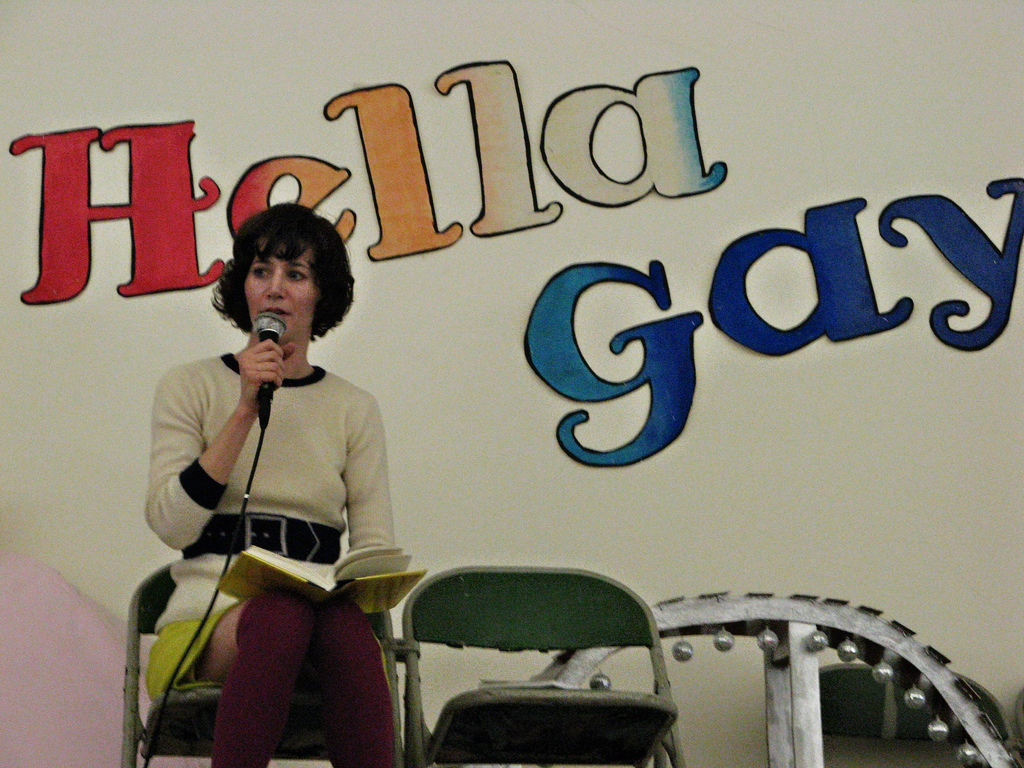
July reading at Modern Times Bookstore in San Francisco (c. 2007)

July was immersed in the riot grrrl scene in Portland and motivated by its do-it-yourself ethos, and she began an effort that she described as "a free alternative distribution system for women movie-makers". One of July's reasons for starting the project was to apply the concepts of riot grrrl into the filmmaking world. The idea was to connect as many women artists as possible, let them see each other's work, and foster a sense of community. Participants sent a self-made short film to July, who mailed back a compilation videotape containing that film and nine others – a "chainletter tape". When it began in 1995, the project was called Big Miss Moviola but was soon renamed Joanie4Jackie. July's first film, Atlanta, appears on the second tape of the series. July ran the project for seven years, handing it off to the film department of Bard College in 2003.

In spring 2016, July donated an archive of Joanie4Jackie to the Getty Research Institute. The collection includes more than 200 titles from the 1990s and 2000s, videos from Joanie4Jackie events, booklets, posters, hand-written letters from participants, and other documentation. Thomas W. Gaehtgens, the director of the Getty Research Institute, stated that the acquisition is "an esteemed addition to our Special Collections that connects to work by many important 20th century artists who are also represented in our archives, such as Eleanor Antin, Yvonne Rainer and Carolee Schneemann."

=== The Amateurist ===
July's film The Amateurist (1998) follows a researcher examining via a video monitor a more conventionally beautiful woman; July plays both roles. July wrote, directed, and starred in the film. The film won the Cinematexas Best Experimental and No Budget Awards 1999, New York Expo 1999 Silver Award Experimental, and San Francisco Golden Gate Award Silver Spire 2000.

=== Nest of Tens ===
In October 2000, July released Nest of Tens. The 27-minute video juxtaposes four unrelated scenarios in which "seemingly everyday people go about acting completely normal while demonstrating distinct abnormality." July wrote and directed the film with Polly Bilchuk in the starring role. Nest of Tens has been placed in the permanent online collection of the Metropolitan Museum of Art. Nest of Tens won the International Short Film Festival Oberhausen's main prize in 2001 and the Cinematexas International Short Film Festival's Gecko Award in 2000.

=== Me and You and Everyone We Know ===
Filmmaker rated July number one in their "25 New Faces of Indie Film" in 2004. After winning a slot in a Sundance workshop, she developed her first feature-length film, Me and You and Everyone We Know, which premiered in 2005.

The film won the Caméra d'Or prize at the 2005 Cannes Film Festival as well as the Special Jury Prize at the Sundance Film Festival, Best First Feature at the Philadelphia Film Festival, Feature Audience Award for Best Narrative Feature at the San Francisco International Film Festival, and Audience Award for Best Narrative Feature at the Los Angeles Film Festival.

=== The Future ===
July's second film was originally titled "Satisfaction" but was later renamed The Future, with July in a lead role. The film premiered at the 2011 Sundance Film Festival and was nominated for a Golden Bear at the 61st Berlin International Film Festival.

=== Kajillionaire ===
In March 2018, it was announced July would write and direct a heist film produced by Plan B Entertainment and Annapurna Pictures. That same month, Evan Rachel Wood, Richard Jenkins, Debra Winger and Gina Rodriguez joined the cast of the film. In June 2018, Mark Ivanir joined the cast of the film. Principal photography began in May 2018. Its theatrical release was on September 25, 2020.

=== Other film work ===
Wayne Wang consulted with July about aspects of his 2001 feature-length film The Center of the World, for which she received a story credit. July appears as herself in the 2017 documentary Turn It Around: The Story of East Bay Punk. She was interviewed for the film !Women Art Revolution. July narrates the documentary Fire of Love.

== Music and spoken word ==
July recorded her first EP for Kill Rock Stars in 1996, titled Margie Ruskie Stops Time, with music by The Need. She released two full-length LPs, 10 Million Hours A Mile in 1997 and The Binet-Simon Test in 1998, both on Kill Rock Stars. She collaborated with Calvin Johnson in his musical project Dub Narcotic Sound System, and in 1999 she made a split EP with IQU, released on Johnson's K Records.

== Acting ==
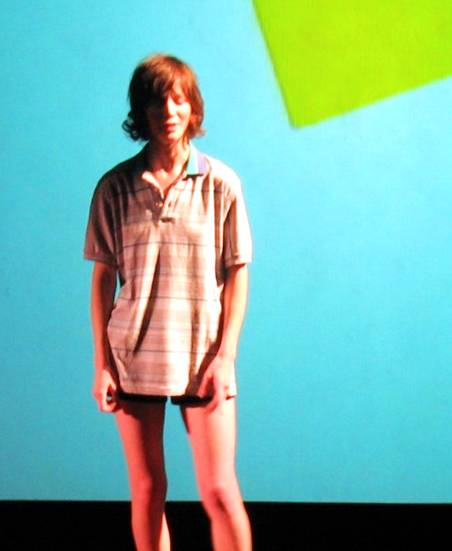
July at the San Francisco Cinematheque fundraiser at Theater Artaud, 2006

July has acted in many of her own short films, including Atlanta, The Amateurist, Nest of Tens, Are You The Favorite Person of Anyone?, and her feature-length films Me and You and Everyone We Know and The Future. She also made an appearance in the film Jesus' Son (1998). She appeared in an episode of Portlandia in 2012. She co-starred in Josephine Decker's 2018 feature film, Madeline's Madeline.

== Live performance pieces ==
In 1998, July made Love Diamond, her first full-length multimedia performance piece – in her description, a "live movie." This two-hour stage work featured July playing multiple characters, humorously depicting women's perceived cultural roles. This was followed by a second full-length performance piece, The Swan Tool, and a six-minute film, Getting Stronger Every Day (2001). The latter is an abstract view of a grown man and a little girl, seemingly taunted by indistinct floating shapes while an offscreen narrator recounts a tale of real-life pedophilia. The Swan Tool is another "live movie", a one-woman show in which July plays Lisa Cobb, a woman searching for her lost body. Although it's peppered with deadpan comedy, the surrealist story concerns "childhood sexual traumas, adult alienation, and persistent, unfocused guilt."

In 2006, after completing her first feature film, she went on to create another multimedia piece, Things We Don't Understand and Definitely Are Not Going To Talk About, which she performed in Los Angeles, San Francisco, and New York. This stage show contained several ideas that would become key elements of her later film, The Future.

In March 2015, July premiered her performance work New Society as part of the 58th San Francisco International Film Festival. In the program for the performance, July requested the audience not share details of the show, stating it is now "a rare sensation to sit down in a theater with no idea what will happen."

== Other art projects ==
With artist Harrell Fletcher, July founded the online art project Learning to Love You More (2002–2009). The project's website offered assignments to artists whose submissions became part of "an ever-changing series of exhibitions, screenings and radio broadcasts presented all over the world." Over 8,000 people participated in the project. In addition to its internet presentations, Learning to Love You More also compiled exhibitions for the Whitney Museum, the Seattle Art Museum, and other hosts. A book version of the project's online art was released in 2007. Starting on May 1, 2009 the project's website stopped accepting assignment submissions. In 2010, the San Francisco Museum of Modern Art acquired the website, to preserve it as an archive of the project online.

July constructed a sculptural exhibition, Eleven Heavy Things, for the 2009 Venice Biennale. Its assortment of cartoonish shapes, made sturdy with fiberglass and steel, were designed for playful interaction by visitors. The exhibition was also shown in New York City at Union Square Park and in Los Angeles at the MOCA Pacific Design Center.

In 2013, she organized We Think Alone, an art project involving the private emails of public figures. Unredacted except for the recipients' names, the emails were freely donated by a disparate group of notable persons including author Sheila Heti, theoretical physicist Lee Smolin, basketball player Kareem Abdul-Jabbar, and actress Kirsten Dunst. July grouped selected emails by topic, and sent a new set to the project's subscribers every week for 20 weeks. One reviewer described the emails as "simultaneously mundane and eerily revealing; they shed light on how people in the public eye craft their private identities... [they] also underscore, in some way, the way all of us present ourselves over email: excessively formal or passive-aggressive, lovey-dovey, flakey, overly excited."

In 2014, July created Somebody, an iOS app which allows users to compose a message to be delivered to someone else in-person, or to deliver someone else's message in-person. When a user sends their friend a message through Somebody, it goes not to the friend but to the Somebody user nearest to the friend. This person (likely a stranger) delivers the message verbally, acting as a stand-in. The project was funded by Miu Miu. The app closed on October 31, 2015.

In 2019, July created an Instagram series starring herself and Margaret Qualley. The series depicted July and Qualley mediating a strained relationship over FaceTime videos and text conversations. It also included appearances by Jaden Smith, the suggestion of a "Hazion Circle" ritual, and Sharon Van Etten writing a song for them.

In 2022, July collaborated with Mack Books to create Services, a limited edition book sculpture composed of photographs and texts between July and Richie Jay Benedicto, a trans woman living in the Philippines who offered services to increase the readership of self-published authors. The first six months of July and Benedicto's correspondence, which coincided with the first six months of COVID-19 lockdowns in the United States, were published in the book. Only 25 copies were made available for sale.

For its fall 2024 campaign, Prada worked with July on "Now That We're Here", a photo series featuring Hunter Schafer, Letitia Wright, Damson Idris, Harris Dickinson, Ma Yili, and others encouraging people to call into a hotline where they could interact with pre-recorded scripts recorded by July.

== Writing ==
July's short story "The Boy from Lam Kien" was published in 2005 by Cloverfield Press as a limited-edition chapbook. Another short story, "Something That Needs Nothing", was published in the following year by The New Yorker.

=== No One Belongs Here More Than You ===
No One Belongs Here More Than You, July's collection of short stories, was published by Scribner in 2007. It won the Frank O'Connor International Short Story Award on September 24, 2007.

In The New York Times, Sheelah Kolhatkar gave the collection a mixed review: "A handful of these stories are sweet and revealing, although in many cases the attempt to create 'art' is too self-conscious, and the effort comes off as pointlessly strange." Kirkus Reviews called it "a smart, original collection" and "an accomplished debut collection of 16 stories, simultaneously bizarre and achingly familiar." Writing in The Guardian, Josh Lacey called the volume "a fabulous collection," saying that "although a few read like experiments that didn't quite work, the majority of the 16 stories in No One Belongs Here More Than You are blisteringly good."

As of 2015 the collection has more than 200,000 copies in circulation.

=== It Chooses You ===
July's non-fiction story collection It Chooses You was published by McSweeney's in 2011. During the writing of her screenplay The Future in 2009, July had gone around Los Angeles accompanied by photographer Brigitte Sire to interview a random selection of thirteen PennySaver sellers. The work received mixed reviews, with some citing the collection's "lasting impression" of realistic struggle and some calling the mumblecore-influenced writing style a "cheap trick" in text format.

=== The First Bad Man ===
July's first novel The First Bad Man was published by Scribner in January 2015. The narrative centers around Cheryl Glickman, a middle-aged woman in crisis whose life abruptly changes course when a young woman named Clee moves into her home and they form a complex relationship.

In her review for The New York Times Book Review, Lauren Groff wrote that The First Bad Man "makes for a wry, smart companion on any day. It's warm. It has a heartbeat and a pulse. This is a book that is painfully alive."

=== All Fours ===
July's second novel, All Fours, was released on May 14, 2024 by Penguin Random House. The novel follows a 45-year-old perimenopausal woman who, after having an extramarital affair during a road trip, has a sexual awakening. It was shortlisted for the 2024 National Book Award for Fiction and the Women's Prize for Fiction.

== Style and themes ==
July was heavily inspired by the riot grrrl movement. She was friends with several of the bands who were part of the movement such as Bikini Kill, Excuse 17, and Heavens to Betsy.

Her films have a common theme of intimacy. July creates slice of life films using ordinary characters. She describes this as her being "desperate to bring people together." In her later career, she's become more interested in how people sabotage coming together.

July has received criticism for being too niche or trying too hard to seem quirky. According to The New York Times, "July has come to personify everything infuriating about the Etsy-shopping, Wes Anderson-quoting, McSweeney's-reading, coastal-living category of upscale urban bohemia that flourished in the aughts." She is often categorized with directors like Wes Anderson and Noah Baumbach, but says she gets more pushback than them due to her films being more emotional and feminine. In the same interview with The New York Times, July explained that she likes the directors she's been compared to, but they never get criticized for making films about themselves, though she as a female filmmaker is often labeled "self-obsessed." In a 2015 Guardian article, July added, "Yes, it's pretty clear that 'whimsical' is a diminishing word, [...] I almost think asking the question is like I'm being asked to gossip about myself. I think it's kind of a female thing, being asked to gossip about yourself. I think I'm maybe done with that."

July also often includes the theme of sex in her films. The New York Times describes it "as both a sudden surprise and a way to illuminate the inner lives of her characters". July elaborated: "I was always interested in sex, even as a kid. Sex includes shame and humiliation and fantasies and longing. It's so dense with the kinds of things I'm interested in."

She has also expressed her interest in the rhythm and feeling of film rather than being inspired by other filmmakers and stated that she wouldn't call herself a cinephile.

In between working on Me and You and Everyone We Know and The Future, July began to incorporate some of the avant-garde ideas she had done in theater into her films. Some of these were well-received on stage but not on screen, such as the talking cat in The Future, which she was later criticized for by viewers.

July also has a strong interest in clothing and costumes. She served as the lookbook creative director for the Uniqlo UT 2019 clothing line.

== Personal life ==
July was married to filmmaker and visual artist Mike Mills, with whom she has a non-binary child, born in March 2012. July and Mills met at both of their first Sundance Festival premieres in 2005, and married in mid-2009. In July 2022, July announced that she and Mills were separated romantically, although they continue to live near each other and co-parent.

In a 2007 interview with Bust magazine, July spoke of the importance which feminism has had in her life: "It's just being pro your ability to do what you need to do. [...] When I say 'feminist', I mean that in the most complex, interesting, exciting way!" In a 2017 interview on Idaho Public Television, July explained that once she started confronting the racial issues in current-day politics, she started contacting publishers and revising her work, realizing that not everything she had said was racially and politically sound.

She changed her last name to "July" when she was 15, after a character based on her in a story by her high school best friend, Johanna Fateman. She changed her name legally in her early 20s. Her father was accepting of the decision.

== Filmography ==
=== Full-length films ===
- Me and You and Everyone We Know (2005) – wrote, directed, and acted
- The Future (2011) – wrote, directed, and acted
- Kajillionaire (2020) – wrote and directed

=== Short films ===
- I Started Out with Nothing and I Still Have Most of It Left
- Atlanta (1996) – appeared on Audio-Cinematic Mix Tape (Peripheral Produce)
- The Amateurist (1998)
- A Shape Called Horse (1999) – appeared on Video Fanzine #1 (Kill Rock Stars)
- Nest of Tens (1999) (Peripheral Produce)
- Getting Stronger Every Day (2001) – 6 min 30 s, appeared on Peripheral Produce: All-Time Greatest Hits: a collection of experimental films and videos (Peripheral Produce)
- Haysha Royko (2003) – 4 min
- Are You the Favorite Person of Anybody? (2005) – appeared on Wholphin issue 1
- Somebody (2014), Miu Miu's Women's Tales 8 – 10 min 14 s
- Miranda July Introduces the Miranda (2014) – advertisement for a handbag designed by July and Welcome Companions, with music by JD Samson.

=== Other film work ===
- The Portland Girl Convention (1996) by Emily B. Kingan – appeared as herself
- Jesus' Son (1999) (Lions Gate Entertainment) – acted
- The Subconscious Art of Graffiti Removal (2001) – narrated
- The Center of the World (2001) – co-wrote story
- Turn It Around: The Story of East Bay Punk (2017) – appeared
- Madeline's Madeline (2018) – acted
- Fire of Love (2022) – narrated

=== Music videos ===
- "Get Up" by Sleater-Kinney (1999) – directed
- "Top Ranking" by Blonde Redhead (2007) – acted
- "Hurry On Home" by Sleater-Kinney (2019) – directed, cameo

== Bibliography ==
=== Books ===
==== Solo ====
- —— (2007). No One Belongs Here More Than You: Stories. New York City: Scribner. ISBN 9780743299398.
- —— (2011). It Chooses You. With photographs by Brigitte Sire. San Francisco: McSweeney's, Irregulars. ISBN 9781936365012.
- —— (2015). The First Bad Man: A Novel. New York City: Scribner. ISBN 9781439172575.
- —— (2020). Miranda July. (artist monograph). Munich: Prestel Publishing. ISBN 9783791385211.
- —— (2024). All Fours. New York: Penguin Random House. ISBN 9780593190265.

==== Collaboration ====
- ——; Fletcher, Harrell (2007). Learning to Love You More. Munich: Prestel Publishing. ISBN 9783791337333.
- ——; Benedicto, Richie Jay (2022). Services. Mack Books.

=== Short fiction ===
Year	Title (Note: Short stories unless otherwise noted.)	First published	Reprinted/collected	Notes
2007	Roy Spivey	July, Miranda (June 11–18, 2007). "Roy Spivey". The New Yorker.	July, Miranda (August 29, 2022). "Roy Spivey". Fiction. June 11 & 18, 2007. The New Yorker. 98 (26): 56–59.	

- "Jack and Al" (Fall 2002) (Mississippi Review)
- "The Moves" (Spring 2003) (Tin House)
- "This Person" (Spring 2003) (Bridge Magazine)
- "Birthmark" (Spring 2003) (Paris Review)
- "Frances Gabe's Self Cleaning House" (Fall 2003) (Nest)
- "It Was Romance" (Fall 2003) (Harvard Review)
- "Making Love in 2003" (Fall 2003) (Paris Review)
- "The Man on the Stairs" (Spring/Summer 2004) (Fence Magazine])
- "The Boy from Lam Kien" Los Angeles: Cloverfield Press, 2005. ISBN 978-0976047827.
- "The Shared Patio" (Winter 2005) (Zoetrope: All-Story)
- "Something That Needs Nothing" (September 18, 2006) (The New Yorker)
- "Majesty" (September 28, 2006) (Timothy McSweeney's Quarterly Concern)
- "The Swim Team" (January 2007) (Harper's Magazine)
- "The Metal Bowl" (September 4, 2017) (The New Yorker)

———————

Bibliography notes

== Performances ==
- Love Diamond (1998–2000)
- The Swan Tool (2000–2002)
- How I Learned to Draw (2002–2003)
- Things We Don't Understand and Are Definitely Not Going to Talk About (2006–2008)
- New Society (2015)

== Discography ==
=== Albums ===
- 10 Million Hours a Mile (1997) (Kill Rock Stars)
- The Binet-Simon Test (1998) (Kill Rock Stars)

=== EPs ===
- Margie Ruskie Stops Time EP (1996) with music by The Need (Kill Rock Stars)
- Girls on Dates split EP with IQU (1999) (K Records)

== Awards ==
- 1998: Andrea Frank Foundation Grant
- 2002: Creative Capital Emerging Fields Award
- 2005: Cannes Film Festival Caméra d'Or
- 2005: Sundance Film Festival Special Jury Prize for Originality of Vision
- 2007: Frank O'Connor International Short Story Award
- 2016: Academy of Motion Pictures Arts and Sciences membership invitation
- 2023: Peabody Award
- 2025: Guggenheim Fellowship

== In popular culture ==
- "Miranda July Called Before Congress To Explain Exactly What Her Whole Thing Is". The Onion. January 21, 2012. (Satirical piece)

== See also ==
- List of female film and television directors
