= The Geometrid =

Studio album by Looper
- Released: 8 May 2000
- Length: 35:06
- Labels: Jeepster; Sub Pop
- Producer: Looper

Looper chronology
Up a Tree (1999)	The Geometrid (2000)	The Snare (2002)

Singles from The Geometrid
- 1. "Mondo '77" Released: 2000

The Geometrid is the second studio album by Looper, released in 2000. It peaked at number 22 on the UK Independent Albums Chart.

== Critical reception ==
Professional ratings
Aggregate scores
Source	Rating
Metacritic	67/100
Review scores
Source	Rating
AllMusic	3/5 stars
The Encyclopedia of Popular Music	3/5 stars
NME	3/5 stars
Pitchfork	6.8/10

The Geometrid was met with "generally favorable" reviews from critics. At Metacritic, which assigns a weighted average rating out of 100 to reviews from mainstream publications, this release received an average score of 67, based on 14 reviews.

Exclaim! called The Geometrid "a beautiful, modern pop record." The Guardian deemed it "a collection of shabbily produced electro-indie ditties hamstrung by half-hearted vocals and laughably leaden beats." The Cleveland Scene considered it "a fascinating blend of techno beats with the warmth and invitation of a purer and more populist brand of pop music."

== Track listing ==
No.	Title	Length
1.	"Mondo '77"	4:56
2.	"On the Flipside"	3:51
3.	"Modem Song"	3:05
4.	"Uncle Ray"	3:34
5.	"PuddleMonkey"	0:26
6.	"These Things"	4:10
7.	"Bug Rain"	3:35
8.	"My Robot"	3:35
9.	"Tomorrow's World"	4:05
10.	"Money Hair"	3:59

== Charts ==
Chart	Peak position
Scottish Albums (Official Charts)	61
UK Independent Albums (OCC)	22
