= North Atlantic Books =

Non-profit, independent publisher based in Berkeley, California

- Status: Active
- Founded: 1974
- Founder: Richard Grossinger, Lindy Hough
- Country of origin: United States
- Headquarters location: Berkeley, California
- Distribution: Penguin Random House Publisher Services
- Key people: Tim McKee
- Publication types: Books, film
- Imprints: Evolver Editions, Blue Snake Books
- Official website: northatlanticbooks.com

North Atlantic Books is a non-profit, independent publisher based in Berkeley, California, United States. Distributed by Penguin Random House Publisher Services, Founded by authors Richard Grossinger and Lindy Hough in Vermont, North Atlantic Books was named partly for the North Atlantic region where it began in 1974, as well as Alan Van Newkirk's Geographic Foundation of the North Atlantic, an early (1970) ecological center founded in Antigonish, Nova Scotia, by radicals from Detroit. The publisher also cites Edward Dorn's 1960s poem, "North Atlantic Turbine: A Theory of Truth", which very early described the dangers of global commoditization by the Western World, as an inspiration in the company's name.

Genres published by North Atlantic Books include yoga, somatics, social justice, bodywork, health and healing, Buddhism, grief, and internal martial arts (through its imprint Blue Snake Books). In 1980, North Atlantic Books was incorporated as a 501(c)(3) non-profit educational organization.

== Notable titles and authors ==
North Atlantic Books is the publisher of the first installment of the New York Times bestselling children's book Walter the Farting Dog by William Kotzwinkle and Glenn Murray, with a 10th anniversary edition of the book published in August 2011. The publisher is also credited with publishing the complete thirteen-volume series of short stories from Nebula Award-winning science fiction writer Theodore Sturgeon. Other notable works from North Atlantic include Jon Klimos's Channeling: Investigations on Receiving Information from Paranormal Sources (1998), described by Newsweek as "the sacred text on channeling," and Patrick Doud's The Winnitok Tales, a series the Midwest Book Review praised for "memorable characters, poetic language, and driving narrative to these timeless tales that recall the classic epic adventure stories." North Atlantic has published all four volumes of poetry by Pushcart Prize-winner BJ Ward.

A major motion picture adaptation of When the Game Stands Tall (2003), starring Jim Caviezel, Laura Dern, Michael Chiklis and Alexander Ludwig was scheduled to be released in fall 2014.

Many notable personalities such as Mariel Hemingway, Oliver Sacks, Henry Louis Gates Jr., Sally Kempton, and Nancy Pelosi have contributed forewords to North Atlantic titles, and the publisher counts Thich Nhat Hanh, Noam Chomsky, and Howard Zinn among those who have endorsed titles.

According to filmmaker, author, and performer Miranda July, Grossinger and Hough's daughter, she and her brother were part of the company's early operations, which included "packing Jiffy bags with books for shipment." July claims her upbringing, North Atlantic Books' presence specifically, instilled in her a love of writing "that is at the basis of all the things that I do."

Bestselling author and writer Jonathan Lethem has also been tied to North Atlantic Books as the publisher's first paid employee, and later provided an introduction for Theodore Sturgeon's book The Man Who Lost the Sea.

== Awards and recognition ==
- 2004: BJ Ward was awarded the Pushcart Prize for his poem "Roy Orbison's Last Three Notes."
- 2008: The PEN Oakland/Josephine Miles Literary Award was given to Cecil Brown for Dude, Where's My Black Studies Department?: The Disappearance of Black Americans from Our Universities.
- 2008: Phoebe Gloeckner, author of A Child's Life and Other Stories and Diary of a Teenage Girl, was awarded a Guggenheim Fellowship.
- 2011: Publishers Weekly listed North Atlantic Books as a "Top 10 Fastest Growing Indie Publisher."
- 2011: Endless Path by Rafe Martin received a Storytelling World Resource Award in the Storytelling Collection category.
- 2011: Noach Dzmura, editor of Balancing on the Mechitza: Transgender in Jewish Community, received the Lambda Literary Award for the best nonfiction piece in the Transgender category.
- 2011: Keep Your Wives Away From Them, an anthology edited by Miryam Kabakov, received a Golden Crown Literary Award in the Anthology category.2012: Publishers Weekly featured North Atlantic Books in its annual "Mind, Body, Spirit" issue, noting, "As NAB approaches its 40th anniversary,... it continues to evolve within the body, mind, and spirit segment,... keep pace with changing tastes,... expand the reach of its established authors through new formats," and engage its audience through "the new NAB Communities interactive social network and web journal."
- 2013: The PEN Oakland/Josephine Miles Literary Award was given to Christopher Wagstaff for A Poet's Mind: Collected Interviews of Robert Duncan.

== Evolver Editions ==
Launched in 2011, Evolver Editions is an imprint of North Atlantic Books presenting voices of the transformation movement of "psychic evolution," a spiritual counterculture that explores the concept of consciousness. The imprint is a collaboration between North Atlantic Books and Evolver LLC, which publishes the online magazine Reality Sandwich and online social network Evolver.net. Topics covered by Evolver Editions' authors include shamanism, environmental design, theories in cosmology, and strategies for political organizing. Key authors include Daniel Pinchbeck, José Argüelles (organizer of the 1987 Harmonic Convergence), Tom Atlee, and Charles Eisenstein.

== Blue Snake Books ==
Blue Snake Books was founded in 2005 as a dedicated martial arts imprint of North Atlantic Books, though the company has been publishing martial arts titles for more than 25 years. Disciplines of martial arts featured include capoeira, karate, muay thai, tai chi, bagua, judo, and jujutsu. Blue Snake Books authors include tai chi master Bruce Frantzis.

== Io Magazine ==
While Grossinger was a student at Amherst College and Hough was at Smith College in Massachusetts, they founded North Atlantic Books' progenitor Io Magazine, an alternative college literary magazine in 1964, featuring work from Robert Kelly, Charles Stein, and Nels Richardson, among others. Over the next decade, Io became a counter-cultural journal mixing literature, science, and history, as it came out of Michigan, Maine, and Vermont with issues such as "Alchemy", "Doctrine of Signatures", "Ethnoastronomy", "Oecology", "Dreams", "Earth Geography", and "The Olson-Melville Sourcebooks". Io is credited with publishing early works by Stephen King (his poem, "Brooklyn August," was featured in Io Issue #10), Jayne Anne Phillips, poets Robert Duncan, Charles Olson, Ed Sanders, Diane di Prima, as well as the work of writers including David Wilk, Rob Brezsny, and Phoebe Gloeckner.

In 2009, North Atlantic books created the Io Poetry Series, featuring collections from under-recognized voices in American poetry. Featured poets include Gerrit Lansing, Kenneth Irby, Lindy Hough, and Lenore Kandel. In 2010, Kenneth Irby's Io Poetry Series book The Intent On received the Poetry Society of America's 2010 Shelley Memorial Award. In 2012, North Atlantic Books published Collected Poems of Lenore Kandel, which included several never-before-published poems by the Beat Generation writer and an introduction by poet Diane di Prima. In 2013, it released Catching Light, a collection featuring many never-before published poems by Joanna McClure and a foreword by Michael McClure.
