= Richard Grossinger =

American writer (born 1944)

- Born: 1944 (age 81–82); New York City, New York, U.S.
- Occupations: Writer, publisher
- Spouse: Lindy Hough
- Children: 2, including Miranda July, Robin Grossinger
- Relatives: Jonathan Towers (brother)

Richard Grossinger (born Richard Towers; 1944) is an American writer and founder of North Atlantic Books in Berkeley, California.

== Biography ==
Grossinger was born and raised in New York City, attended Horace Mann School, Amherst College, and the University of Michigan, earning a B.A. in English at Amherst and a Ph.D. in anthropology at Michigan. With his girlfriend at Smith College (later his wife) Lindy Hough, he founded the journal Io in 1964, then founded North Atlantic Books in Vermont in 1974. Between 1970 and 1972 he taught anthropology at the University of Maine, Portland-Gorham, now the University of Southern Maine, and between 1972 and 1977 he taught interdisciplinary studies (including alchemy, Melville, Classical Greek, Jungian psychology, and ethnoastronomy) at Goddard College in Plainfield, Vermont. An ethnographer and self-described psycho-spiritual explorer, as well as a writer and publisher, he has latterly studied a range of alternative medicines.

As a child, a psychic told him that his biological father had actually been a member of the Grossinger family (of the Grossinger's Catskill Resort Hotel, where Grossinger had vacationed) and he eventually changed his last name to reflect this family connection. However, years later he learned that his biological father had been an entirely different person with no connection to the resort.

His brother was Jonathan Towers, a poet who committed suicide in 2005. His daughter is filmmaker, author and performance artist, Miranda July. His son is Robin Grossinger, an author and Senior Scientist at the San Francisco Estuary Institute.

== Books written by Grossinger ==
- Solar Journal (Oecological Sections) (1970) Black Sparrow Press ISBN 0-87685-011-5
- Spaces Wild & Tame (1971) Mudra ISBN 978-0-685-22801-2
- The Book of the Earth and Sky (1971, 2 Vols) Black Sparrow Press ISBN 978-0-87685-090-9
- Mars: A Science Fiction Vision (1972) Io Books [No ISBN]
- Two Essays (Sparrow 7) (1973) Black Sparrow Press [No ISBN]
- The Continents (1973) Black Sparrow Press ISBN 0-87685-162-6
- The Book of Being Born Again into the World (1974) North Atlantic Books ISBN 0-913028-29-0
- Book of the Cranberry Islands (1974) Black Sparrow Press ISBN 0-87685-211-8
- The Windy Passage from Nostalgia (1974) North Atlantic Books ISBN 0-913028-30-4
- The Long Body of the Dream (1974) North Atlantic Books ISBN 0-913028-28-2
- Martian Homecoming at the All-American Revival Church (1974) North Atlantic Books ISBN 0-913028-21-5
- The Slag of Creation (1975) North Atlantic Books ISBN 0-913028-32-0
- The Provinces (1975) North Atlantic books ISBN 0-913028-31-2
- Unfinished Business of Doctor Hermes (1976) North Atlantic Books ISBN 0-913028-43-6
- Planet Medicine: From Stone-Age Shamanism to Post-Industrial Healing (1980/1990) North Atlantic Books ISBN 1-55643-019-1
- The Night Sky: The Science and Anthropology of the Stars and Planets (1981/1988/1992) North Atlantic Books ISBN 1-55643-142-2
- Nuclear Strategy and the Code of the Warrior (1984) North Atlantic Books ISBN 0-938190-50-4
- Embryogenesis: Species, Gender and Identity (1985/2000) North Atlantic Books ISBN 0-938190-82-2
- Waiting for the Martian Express: Cosmic Visitors, Earth Warriors, Luminous Dreams (1989) North Atlantic Books ISBN 1-55643-051-5
- Homeopathy: An Introduction for Skeptics and Beginners (1993) North Atlantic Books ISBN 1-55643-165-1
- Planet Medicine: Modalities (1995/2003) North Atlantic books ISBN 1-55643-391-3
- New Moon (1996) Frog Ltd ISBN 1-883319-44-7
- Out of Babylon: Ghosts of Grossinger's (1997) Frog Ltd ISBN 1-883319-57-9
- Homeopathy: The Great Riddle (1998) North Atlantic Books ISBN 1-55643-290-9
- Embryos, Galaxies, and Sentient Beings: How the Universe Makes Life(2003) North Atlantic Books ISBN 1-55643-419-7
- On the Integration of Nature: Post 9-11 Biopolitical Notes (2005) North Atlantic Books ISBN 1-55643-603-3
- Migraine Auras: When the Visual World Fails (2006) North Atlantic Books ISBN 1-55643-619-X
- The New York Mets: Myth, Ethnography, Subtext (2007) Frog Ltd ISBN 1-58394-205-X
- The Bardo of Waking Life (2008) North Atlantic Books ISBN 1-55643-700-5
- 2013: Raising the Earth to the Next Vibration (2010) North Atlantic Books 9781556438783

== Works edited by Grossinger ==
- The Alchemical Tradition in the Late Twentieth Century (1970)
- Baseball Diamonds: Tales, Traces, Visions & Voodoo from a Native American Rite (1980 with Kevin Kerrane)
- Planetary Mysteries: Megaliths, Glaciers, The Face on Mars, and Aboriginal Dreams (1986, Revised 1993)
- The Dreamlife of Johnny Baseball (1987 with works by Tom Clark, Jerome Klinkowitz, Grossinger, W.P. Kinsella, Richard Russo, Nancy Willard)
- Into the Temple of Baseball (1990/2000 with Kevin Kerrane)

== Select Io Journal editions ==
- #4: Alchemy Issue. 1967.
- #5: Doctrine of Signatures. 1968.
- #6: Ethnoastronomy Issue. 1969.
- #8: Dreams Issue on Oneirology. 1971.
- #9: Mars: A Science Fiction Vision. 1971.
- #10: Baseball Issue. 1971.
- #12: Earth Geography Booklet No. 1. 1972.
- #13: Earth Geography Booklet No. 2. 1972.
- #14: Earth Geography Booklet No. 3. 1973.
- #15: Earth Geography Booklet No. 4. 1973.
- #18: Early Field Notes From the All-American Revival Church. 1973.
- #19: Mind/Memory/Psyche. 1974.
- #20: Biopoesis. 1974.
- #21 'Vermont: Geology and Mineral Industries, Flora, Fauna & Conditions of Sky (1974)
- #22: An Olson-Melville Sourcebook, Vol. 1: The New Found Land/North America. 1976.
- #23: An Olson-Melville Sourcebook, Volume 2: The Mediterranean. 1976.
- #24: Baseball, I Gave You All the Best Years of My Life (1977 with Kevin Kerrane; 1992 with Lisa Conrad)
- #25: Ecology and Consciousness: Traditional Wisdom on the Environment. 1978.
- #26: Alchemy: Pre-Egyptian Legacy, Millennial Promise 1979.
- #31: Alchemical Tradition in the Late Twentieth Century. 1983/1991.
- #34: The Temple of Baseball. 1985.
- #37: Planetary Mysteries 1986.
- #46: Nuclear Strategy and the Code of the Warrior (with Lindy Hough). 1992
