= Teen Dream (disambiguation) =

Teen Dream is a 2010 album by Beach House.

Teen Dream may also refer to:

- Teen Dream (band), American R&B group
- "Teen Dream", a 1977 song by Shaun Cassidy from Born Late
- "Teen Dream", a 1995 song by Teen Angels
- "Teen Dream", a 1995 song by Urusei Yatsura

== See also ==
- Teenage Dream (disambiguation)
