= Thrilled Skinny =

Music band (split 1995)

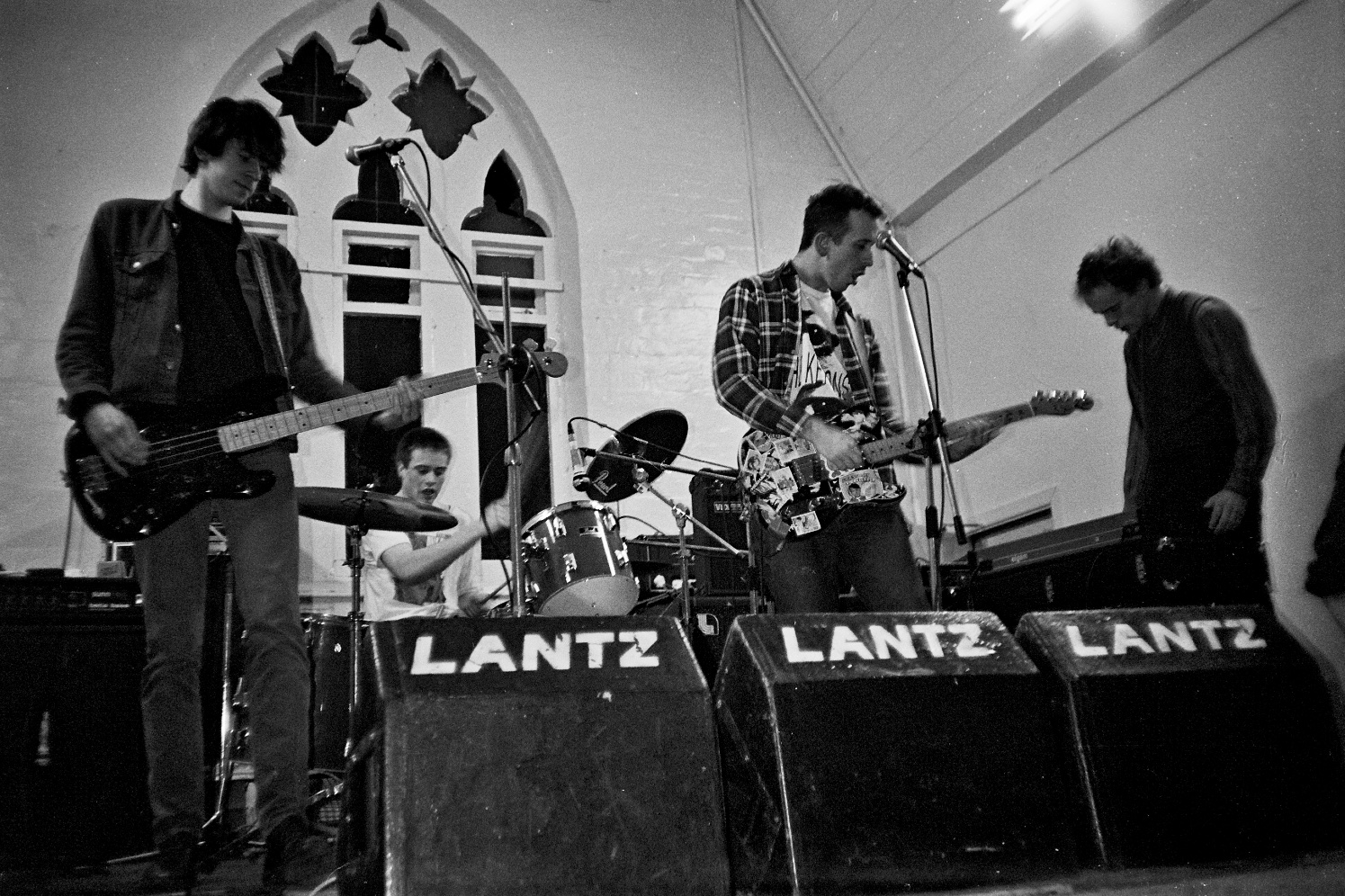
- Thrilled Skinny (1990)

Background information
- Origin: Luton, England
- Genres: Indie pop, post punk
- Years active: 1987–1991
- Labels: Hunchback, Artlos, Pop Noise
- Past members: Simon Goalpost; Andy Furniture aka Vic Sinex; Utensil Realname; Elliot P. Smoke

Thrilled Skinny were an indie band from Luton formed in 1987, who released several singles and two albums between 1987 and 1995, although they split up in 1991.

== History ==
Thrilled Skinny formed in Luton and comprised the pseudonymously named Simon Goalpost (vocals, bass guitar, formerly of Mod band The Theme), Andy Furniture (aka Vic Sinex, vocals, guitar), Utensil Realname (keyboards, backing vocals), and Elliot P. Smoke (drums, backing vocals). They released records on their own Hunchback label and were regularly played by John Peel on his BBC Radio 1 show. They recorded a session for the show in 1988. Described by John Robb as "one of the last of the quixotic British DIY underground bands", they drew comparisons with The Wedding Present but with their own brand of oddball humour. They were inspired by post-punk bands such as Wire, Swell Maps, and the Television Personalities, and by Medway bands such as Thee Milkshakes and Thee Mighty Caesars. Debut album They Said We Wouldn't But We Did was released in 1989, featuring 22 songs in 38 minutes. The band also created Clod Magazine, which, by 2014, had racked up 26 editions.

A compilation of their work was released in 2009 by Pop Noise, who also reissued the Smells a Bit Fishy album.

Simon Goalpost later recorded with Noise Annoys Simon and solo as Simon Bish. The other members formed instrumental band The Knockouts.

== Discography ==
=== Albums ===
- They Said We Wouldn't But We Did (1989), Hunchback
- It's a Good Doss (1990), Hunchback
- Smells a Bit Fishy (1993), Artlos – reissued (2003), Pop Noise
- Just Another Teenage Dream (2009), Pop Noise

=== Singles, EPs ===
- Piece of Plastic EP (1987), Hunchback
- "White Grid" (1988), Hunchback – flexi-disc
- "So Happy to Be Alive" (1988), Hunchback
- Little Piggies and Cows EP (1989), Hunchback
- Teenage Dream EP (1990), Hunchback
- Let There Be Shelving EP (1991), Hunchback
- Not Half an EP (1991), Hunchback
- "Popstar Prat" (1995), Damaged Goods

=== Compilation appearances ===
- Fridge No. 1 EP (1989), Glut: "Pop Star Prat"
- Something's Burning in Paradise Again... (1989), Subtle: "Pop Star Prat"
- Cloth Ears Five, Fourth Dimension: "Pinless"
- Own Goal, Goalpost Records: "Biscuits in the tin (live)", "Common Ground (remix)"
