= Looper (band) =

Indie-pop band

- 1999 press photo of Looper

Background information
- Origin: Glasgow, Scotland
- Genres: Lofi hip hop; Chill hop; Folk hop
- Years active: 1998–present
- Labels: Jeepster, Sub-Pop, Mute
- Members: Stuart David; Karn David; Ronnie Black; Scott Twynholm

Looper are a Scottish electronic music group fronted by Belle and Sebastian co-founder Stuart David.

They have been credited with originating two distinct musical genres- Folk Hop, and Horror Pop (later termed Noir'n'B or Switchblade Pop)

The band formed in 1998 for a show at the Glasgow School of Art and released their first single "Impossible Things" on the Subpop label a few months later.

They have released six albums, Up a Tree (1999), The Geometrid (2000), The Snare (2002), Offgrid:Offline (2015), Quiet & Small (2018), A Luminous Place (2023) and a 5-CD box set These Things (2015), as well as a series of EPs titled The MP3 EPs.

== Biography ==
Looper emerged from Belle & Sebastian in 1997, when Stuart David (co-founder and bass player of B&S) and his wife Karn (an artist who directed the early B&S videos) collaborated for a show at Glasgow School of Art. A degree show fundraiser for Stuart's sister Karla Black – who received a Turner Prize nomination in 2011- the performance was a multi-media affair incorporating TVs, super 8 film, 35mm slides and kinetic sculptures. Musical influences on Looper have included Devo, Kraftwerk, Orchestral Manoeuvres in the Dark, and Paul Simon.

Their first album, Up a Tree, was released in 1999 on the Sub Pop label in the U.S. and by Jeepster Records in the rest of the world. It was followed in 2000 by The Geometrid on the same labels. After touring the U.S. for three months with The Flaming Lips in 2000 they signed to Mute Records. They have now licensed their full back catalogue to Mute.

Since then, Looper have been releasing their music free to the public at their Looperama website, funding this experiment by licensing the use of their songs in high-profile Hollywood films and ad campaigns. Their most recognizable song is "Mondo '77", from their second album, The Geometrid. It has been featured in American television commercials for Xerox and Partnership for a Drug-Free America, in numerous films including Vanilla Sky and The Edukators, and on the American Dad! episode "All About Steve". Another track from that album, "My Robot", is featured in the film The Girl Next Door. These two songs ("Mondo '77", "My Robot") are also featured in the Xbox video game Project Gotham Racing. The song "Burning Flies", from the album Up a Tree, is part of the soundtrack to the Mission Hill pilot episode. Other films their songs have appeared in include Out Cold, and Dog Park.

== Discography ==
- Up a Tree (1999)
- The Geometrid (2000)
- The Snare (2002)
- The MP3 EPs (2003-2006)
- Offgrid:Offline (2015)
- These Things (5 CD box set) (2015)
- Quiet & Small (2018)
- A Luminous Place (2023)
