= Snow Patrol discography =

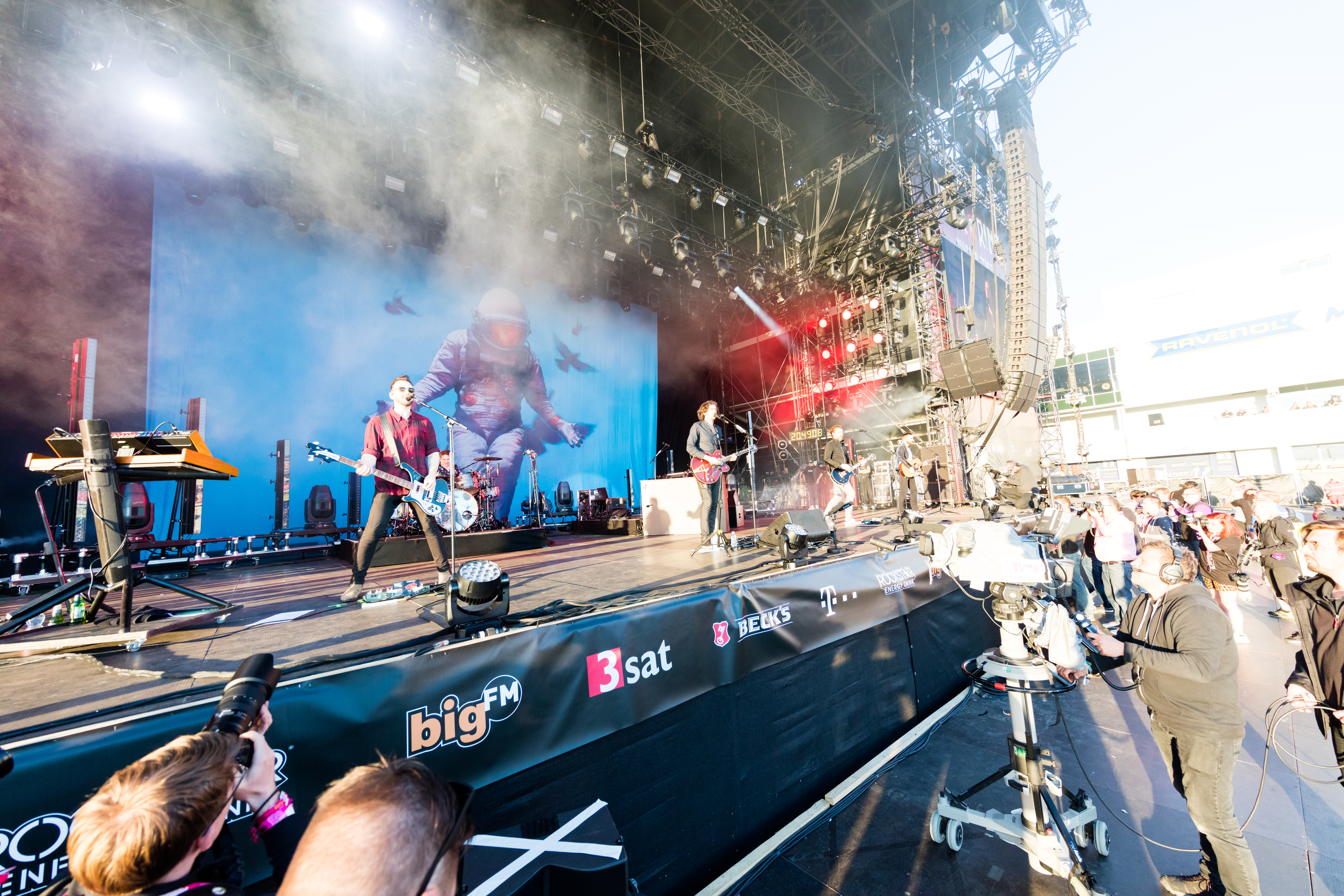
- Snow Patrol performing live at Rock am Ring in 2018
- Studio albums: 8
- Extended plays: 8
- Compilation albums: 3
- Singles: 36
- Video albums: 1
- Music videos: 39
- Other appearances: 7

The discography of Snow Patrol, an alternative rock band, consists of eight studio albums, thirty-two singles, eight extended plays, three compilation albums and one live DVD. Snow Patrol was formed in 1994 by Gary Lightbody, Michael Morrison and Mark McClelland under the name Shrug. They released an extended play (EP) titled The Yogurt vs. Yogurt Debate. Morrison left in 1995, and the band changed their name to Polarbear. Under this name they released their other EP, Starfighter Pilot, on the Electric Honey label. Drummer Jonny Quinn joined in 1997 and the band signed to Jeepster Records the same year. They then underwent their final name change to Snow Patrol. The band's first two studio albums: Songs for Polarbears and When It's All Over We Still Have to Clear Up were released in 1998 and 2001 respectively, but failed to do well commercially. Subsequently, the band was dropped by the label.

Guitarist Nathan Connolly joined in 2002 and Snow Patrol was signed to Fiction and Interscope record labels in 2003. Their third studio album, Final Straw, was released the same year, and was a commercial success. "Run" became their breakthrough single in the United Kingdom, charting in the top 5 on the singles chart. The album eventually sold 1.6 million copies in the UK and won the Ivor Novello Album Award. During the end of the Final Straw Tour of 2003–2005, founding bassist Mark McClelland was fired. The band recruited Paul Wilson as his replacement, and touring keyboardist Tom Simpson was made a permanent member of the band. The next album, Eyes Open, released in 2006, was more successful. Sales of the album were boosted by the success of the Grammy-nominated "Chasing Cars", which reached the top 10 in the UK and sold 2.5 million downloads in the US. The album itself won a Meteor Award and was nominated for several more. It sold 2.1 million copies in the UK and achieved platinum status in the United States.

The band's fifth album A Hundred Million Suns was released in 2008. A compilation, titled Up to Now, featuring songs from the group's 15-year career, was released in November 2009. The band has sold more than ten million albums worldwide.

== Albums ==
=== Studio albums ===
List of albums, with selected chart positions
Title	Album details	Peak chart positions										Sales	Certifications
Title	Album details	UK	AUS	AUT	BEL	GER	IRL	NLD	NZ	SWI	US	Sales	Certifications
Songs for Polarbears	Released: 31 August 1998; Label: Jeepster; Format: CD, LP	143	—	—	—	—	90	—	—	—	—		BPI: Gold
When It's All Over We Still Have to Clear Up	Released: 5 March 2001; Label: Jeepster; Format: CD, LP	129	—	—	—	—	—	—	—	—	—		BPI: Gold
Final Straw	Released: 4 August 2003; Label: Fiction / Interscope; Format: CD, LP, SACD, CD+DVD	3	— (Note: Final Straw did not enter the Australian ARIA Albums Chart but peaked at number 13 on the ARIA Hitseekers Chart.)	—	—	—	1	49	—	—	91	UK: 1,894,296 (Note: Sales as of July 2026); US: 618,000 (Note: Sales as of October 2008)	BPI: 6× Platinum; ARIA: Platinum; IRMA: 6× Platinum; RIAA: Gold
Eyes Open	Released: 28 April 2006; Label: Fiction / Interscope; Format: CD, LP, CD+DVD, digital download	1	1	3	9	17	1	6	1	15	27	UK: 2,600,000 (Note: Sales as of July 2026); US: 1,200,000 (Note: Sales as of October 2008)	BPI: 8× Platinum; ARIA: 4× Platinum; BRMA: Platinum; BVMI: 3× Gold; IFPI AUT: Platinum; IFPI SWI: Gold; IRMA: 7× Platinum; NVPI: Platinum; RIAA: Platinum; RMNZ: 4× Platinum
A Hundred Million Suns	Released: 24 October 2008; Label: Fiction / Interscope; Format: CD, LP, CD+DVD, digital download	2	6	17	16	14	1	8	6	7	9	US: 210,000 (Note: Sales as of November 2011)	BPI: Platinum; ARIA: Gold; BVMI: Gold; IRMA: 3× Platinum; NVPI: Gold
Fallen Empires	Released: 11 November 2011; Label: Fiction / Interscope; Format: CD, LP, CD+DVD, digital download	3	24	10	4	3	1	1	27	6	5		BPI: Platinum; BRMA: Gold; BVMI: Gold; IRMA: Platinum
Wildness	Released: 25 May 2018; Label: Polydor / Republic; Format: CD, LP, digital download	2	12	11	2	9	1	5	— (Note: Wildness did not enter the NZ Top 40 Albums Chart, but peaked at number one on the NZ Heatseeker Albums Chart.)	3	49		BPI: Gold
The Forest Is the Path	Released: 13 September 2024; Label: Polydor; Format: CD, LP, digital download	1	—	17	12	13	2	3	—	10	— (Note: The Forest Is the Path did not enter the US Billboard 200, but peaked at number 35 on the US Billboard Album Sales Chart.)		BPI: Silver
"—" denotes album that did not chart or was not released.

=== Compilation albums ===
List of albums, with selected chart positions
Title	Album details	Peak chart positions										Certifications
Title	Album details	UK	AUS	AUT	BEL	DEN	GER	IRL	NLD	SWI	US	Certifications
Up to Now	Released: 6 November 2009; Label: Fiction/Interscope; Format: 2×CD, digipak, box set, digital download	3	54	62	8	2	38	5	5	36	182	BPI: 4× Platinum; BRMA: Platinum; BVMI: Gold; IFPI AUT: Gold; IRMA: 2× Platinum
Snow Patrol – Best Of The Jeepster Years: 1997-2001	Released: 23 July 2012; Label: Jeepster; Format: digital download, streaming	—	—	—	—	—	—	—	—	—	—	
Greatest Hits	Released: 14 May 2013; Label: Polydor; Format: CD, digital download	—	—	—	—	—	—	—	—	—	113	
Reworked	Released: 8 November 2019; Label: Polydor; Format: CD, digital download, streaming	3	— (Note: Reworked did not enter the ARIA Albums Chart, but peaked at number 16 on the ARIA Digital Album Chart.)	—	95	—	—	3	—	—	— (Note: Reworked did not enter the US Billboard 200, but peaked at number 59 on the US Billboard Album Sales Chart.)	BPI: Silver
"—" denotes album that did not chart or was not released.

== Extended plays ==
Title	EP details
The Yogurt vs. Yogurt Debate^{[A]}	Released: January 1995; Label: Self-released; Format: Cassette
Starfighter Pilot^{[B]}	Released: 13 June 1997; Label: Electric Honey (EHRCD007); Format: CD
Sessions@AOL^{[C]}	Released: 15 June 2004; Label: Fiction/Interscope; Format: Digital download
Live and Acoustic at Park Ave.^{[D]}	Released: 27 December 2005; Label: Fiction/A&M (B0005120-22); Format: CD
Sessions@AOL^{[C]}	Released: 31 October 2006; Label: Fiction/Interscope; Format: Digital download
iTunes Live from London^{[C]}	Released: 19 February 2009; Label: Fiction/Interscope; Format: Digital download
iTunes Live: London Festival '09^{[C]}	Released: 9 July 2009; Label: Fiction/Interscope; Format: Digital download
Reworked (EP1)	Released: 9 August 2019; Label: Polydor; Format: Digital download
Reworked (EP2)	Released: 5 September 2019; Label: Polydor; Format: Digital download
The Fireside Sessions	Released: 21 August 2020; Label: Polydor; Format: CD, digital download

Notes

- A Released under the name Shrug
- B Released under the name Polarbear
- C Released exclusively to iTunes
- D Released exclusively to independent stores in United States

== Singles ==
List of singles, with selected chart positions and certifications, showing year released as single and album name
Title	Year	Peak chart positions										Certifications	Album
Title	Year	UK	AUS	AUT	BEL	GER	IRL	NLD	NZ	SWI	US	Certifications	Album
"Little Hide"	1998	—	—	—	—	—	—	—	—	—	—		Songs for Polarbears
"One Hundred Things You Should Have Done in Bed"	1998	157	—	—	—	—	—	—	—	—	—		Songs for Polarbears
"Velocity Girl / Absolute Gravity"	1998	177	—	—	—	—	—	—	—	—	—		Songs for Polarbears
"Starfighter Pilot"	1999	161	—	—	—	—	—	—	—	—	—		Songs for Polarbears
"Ask Me How I Am"	2000	96	—	—	—	—	—	—	—	—	—		When It's All Over We Still Have to Clear Up
"One Night Is Not Enough"	2001	92	—	—	—	—	—	—	—	—	—		When It's All Over We Still Have to Clear Up
"Spitting Games" (Note: "Spitting Games" was originally released in 2003 and received a re-release in 2004.)	2003	23	—	—	—	—	41	—	—	—	—	BPI: Silver	Final Straw
"Run" (Note: "Run" was re-released in 2010 to promote Up to Now.)	2004	5	76	—	— (Note: "Run" did not enter the Flanders Ultratop 50, but peaked at number 8 on the Ultratip chart.)	92	25	22	—	—	—	BPI: 2× Platinum; ARIA: Gold; RMNZ: Gold	Final Straw
"Chocolate" (Note: "Chocolate" was re-released in 2010 to promote Up to Now.)	2004	24	—	—	—	—	40	34	—	—	—	BPI: Silver	Final Straw
"How to Be Dead"	2004	39	—	—	—	—	42	—	—	—	—		Final Straw
"You're All I Have"	2006	7	— (Note: "You're All I Have" was not eligible to enter the ARIA Singles Chart at the time as it was a digital-only release in Australia, but peaked at number 21 on the ARIA Digital Tracks Chart.)	—	— (Note: "You're All I Have" did not enter the Flanders Ultratop 50, but peaked at number 9 on the Ultratip chart.)	100	12	88	25	— (Note: "You're All I Have" did not enter the Swiss Singles chart, but charted at number 54 on the Swiss Airplay chart.)	—	BPI: Gold; ARIA: Gold	Eyes Open
"Chasing Cars"	2006	6	53	2	3	8	6	21	3	4	5	BPI: 7× Platinum; ARIA: 14× Platinum; BRMA: Gold; BVMI: 2× Platinum; IFPI AUT: 2× Platinum; RIAA: 5× Platinum; RMNZ: 7× Platinum	Eyes Open
"Hands Open"	2006	—	— (Note: "Hands Open" was not eligible to enter the ARIA Singles Chart at the time as it was a digital-only release in Australia, but peaked at number 21 on the ARIA Digital Tracks Chart.)	—	—	—	—	—	34	—	—	ARIA: Gold	Eyes Open
"Set the Fire to the Third Bar" (featuring Martha Wainwright)	2006	18	—	—	41	—	22	—	—	—	54	BPI: Gold	Eyes Open
"Open Your Eyes"	2007	26	53	—	— (Note: "Open Your Eyes" did not enter the Flanders Ultratop 50, but peaked at number 6 on the Ultratip chart.)	73	21	—	—	—	—	BPI: Gold; ARIA: 2× Platinum; RMNZ: Gold	Eyes Open
"Shut Your Eyes"	2007	—	—	12	1	15	—	17	—	26	—	BVMI: Gold	Eyes Open
"Signal Fire"	2007	4	22	—	— (Note: "Signal Fire" did not enter the Flanders Ultratop 50, but peaked at number 15 on the Ultratip chart.)	—	2	—	—	48	65		Music from and Inspired by Spider-Man 3
"Take Back the City"	2008	6	31	35	32	42	4	36	33	46	—	BPI: Silver; ARIA: Gold	A Hundred Million Suns
"Crack the Shutters"	2008	43	57	32	42	28	32	36	—	72	— (Note: "Crack the Shutters" did not enter the Billboard Hot 100, but peaked at number two on the Bubbling Under Hot 100 Singles chart, which acts as an extension to the Hot 100.)	BPI: Silver; ARIA: Gold	A Hundred Million Suns
"If There's a Rocket Tie Me to It"	2009	133	—	—	—	—	—	—	—	— (Note: "If There's a Rocket Tie Me to It" did not enter the Swiss Singles chart, but charted at number 81 on the Swiss Airplay chart.)	—		A Hundred Million Suns
"The Planets Bend Between Us"	2009	—	—	—	—	—	—	— (Note: "The Planets Bend Between Us" did not enter the Netherlands Singles Chart but peaked on the Dutch Tipparade Chart at number eight.)	—	—	—		A Hundred Million Suns
"Just Say Yes"	2009	15	87	38	6	47	6	1	—	— (Note: "Just Say Yes" did not enter the Swiss Singles chart, but charted at number 16 on the Swiss Airplay chart.)	—	BPI: Gold	Up to Now
"An Olive Grove Facing the Sea" (2009 version)	2009	—	—	—	—	—	—	—	—	—	—		Up to Now
"Called Out in the Dark"	2011	11	79	23	7	15	5	12	35	11	78	BPI: Silver; BVMI: Gold	Fallen Empires
"This Isn't Everything You Are"	2011	40	—	—	44	52	18	52	—	— (Note: "This Isn't Everything You Are" did not enter the Swiss Singles chart, but charted at number 31 on the Swiss Airplay chart.)	—		Fallen Empires
"New York"	2011	—	—	—	— (Note: "New York" did not enter the Flanders Ultratop 50, but peaked at number 16 on the Ultratip chart.)	—	—	— (Note: "New York" did not enter the Netherlands Singles Chart but peaked on the Dutch Tipparade Chart at number 21.)	—	—	— (Note: "New York" did not enter the Billboard Hot 100, but peaked at number 11 on the Bubbling Under Hot 100 Singles chart, which acts as an extension to the Hot 100.)		Fallen Empires
"In the End"	2012	100	—	—	43	—	—	35	—	—	—		Fallen Empires
"Lifening"	2012	—	—	—	— (Note: "Lifening" did not enter the Flanders Ultratop 50, but peaked at number 5 on the Ultratip chart.)	—	—	—	—	—	—		Fallen Empires
"The Lightning Strike (What If This Storm Ends?)"	2013	—	—	—	—	—	—	—	—	—	—		A Hundred Million Suns and Greatest Hits
"Don't Give In"	2018	— (Note: "Don't Give In" did not enter the UK Singles Chart, but peaked at number 48 on the UK Singles Sales Chart.)	—	—	5	—	84	— (Note: "Don't Give In" did not enter the Netherlands' Single Top 100 but peaked on the Netherlands' Single Tip Chart at number 23.)	—	—	—		Wildness
"Life on Earth"	2018	—	—	—	— (Note: "Life on Earth" did not enter the Flanders Ultratop 50, but charted as an "extra tip" on the Ultratip chart.)	—	—	—	—	—	—		Wildness
"What If This Is All the Love You Ever Get?"	2018	— (Note: "What If This Is All the Love You Ever Get?" did not enter the UK Singles Chart, but peaked at number 61 on the UK Singles Sales Chart.)	—	—	—	—	—	—	—	—	—		Wildness
"Empress"	2018	—	—	—	— (Note: "Empress" did not enter the Flanders Ultratop 50, but peaked at number 6 on the Ultratip chart.)	—	—	—	—	— (Note: "Empress" did not enter the Swiss Singles chart, but charted at number 78 on the Swiss Airplay chart.)	—		Wildness
"Heal Me"	2018	—	—	—	— (Note: "Heal Me" did not enter the Flanders Ultratop 50, but peaked at number 38 on the Ultratip chart.)	—	—	—	—	—	—		Wildness
"Time Won't Go Slowly"	2019	— (Note: "Time Won't Go Slowly" did not enter the UK Singles Chart, but peaked at number 39 on the UK Singles Sales Chart.)	—	—	—	—	—	—	—	—	—		Reworked
"Reaching Out to You" (with The Saturday Songwriters)	2020	—	—	—	— (Note: "Reaching Out to You" did not enter the Flanders Ultratop 50, but peaked at number 40 on the Ultratip chart.)	—	— (Note: "Reaching Out to You" did not enter the Irish Singles Chart, but peaked at number 13 on the Irish Homegrown Top 20 chart.)	—	—	—	—		The Fireside Sessions
"The Beginning"	2024	— (Note: "The Beginning" did not enter the UK Singles Chart, but peaked at number 93 on the UK Singles Downloads Chart.)	—	—	—	—	— (Note: "The Beginning" did not enter the Irish Singles Chart, but peaked at number 13 on the Irish Homegrown Top 20 chart.)	—	—	—	—		The Forest Is the Path
"This Is the Sound of Your Voice"	2024	— (Note: "This Is the Sound of Your Voice" did not enter the UK Singles Chart, but peaked at number 99 on the UK Singles Downloads Chart.)	—	—	—	—	—	—	—	—	—		The Forest Is the Path
"All"	2024	— (Note: "All" did not enter the UK Singles Chart, but peaked at number 47 on the UK Singles Sales Chart.)	—	—	—	— (Note: "All" did not enter the German Singles Chart, but peaked at number 73 on the Deutsche Download Singles Chart.)	— (Note: "All" did not enter the Irish Singles Chart, but peaked at number 9 on the Irish Homegrown Top 20 chart.)	—	—	—	—		The Forest Is the Path
"But I'll Keep Trying"	2025	—	—	—	—	—	— (Note: "But I'll Keep Trying" did not enter the Irish Singles Chart, but peaked at number 12 on the Irish Homegrown Top 20 chart.)	—	—	—	—		The Forest Is the Path (Deluxe)
"This Is the Silence"	2025	— (Note: "This Is the Silence" did not enter the UK Singles Chart, but peaked at number 86 on the UK Singles Sales Chart.)	—	—	—	—	— (Note: "This Is the Silence" did not enter the Irish Singles Chart, but peaked at number 18 on the Irish Homegrown Top 20 chart.)	—	—	—	—		The Forest Is the Path (Deluxe)
"These Alarms" (with Kylie Minogue)	2026	— (Note: "These Alarms" did not enter the UK Singles Chart, but peaked at number one on the UK Singles Sales Chart.)	— (Note: "These Alarms" did not enter the Australian ARIA Singles Chart but peaked at number six on the ARIA Digital Track Chart.)	—	—	—	—	—	—	—	—		Non-album single
"—" denotes singles that did not chart or were not released.

== Other charted and certified songs ==
List of other charted songs, with selected chart positions, showing year charted and album name
Title	Year	Peak chart positions					Certifications	Album
Title	Year	UK	BEL Tip	GER DL	IRL	NLD Tip	Certifications	Album
"You Could Be Happy"	2008	184	—	—	—	—	BPI: Gold	Eyes Open
"I'll Never Let Go"	2011	—	82	—	—	—		Fallen Empires
"I Won't Let You Go"	2014	—	32	—	—	7		Divergent: Original Motion Picture Soundtrack
"On the Edge of All This" (with The Saturday Songwriters)	2020	—	—	—	— (Note: "On the Edge of All This" did not enter the Irish Singles Chart, but peaked at number 13 on the Irish Homegrown Top 20 chart.)	—		The Fireside Sessions
"Everything’s Here and Nothing’s Lost"	2024	—	—	99	—	—		The Forest Is the Path
"—" denotes songs that did not chart or were not released.

== Video albums ==
Title	Album details
Live at Somerset House	Released: 23 November 2004; Label: Fiction/Interscope (986 900-6); Format: DVD

== Music videos ==
Year	Song	Director(s)	Ref.
1998	"Little Hide"	Gavin Gordon-Rogers	
1998	"One Hundred Things You Should Have Done in Bed"	Gavin Gordon-Rogers	
1998	"Velocity Girl"	Gavin Gordon-Rogers	
1999	"Starfighter Pilot"^{[A]}	James Hyman and Eddy Temple-Morris	
2000	"Ask Me How I Am"	Huse Monfaradi	
2003	"Spitting Games"	Crooked (UK version)	
2004	"Run"^{[B]}	Paul Gore	
2004	"Chocolate"	Marc Webb (Credited as 'Marck Webb')	
2004	"Spitting Games" (re-release)^{[C]}	Paul Gore (US version)	
2004	"How to Be Dead"	Dick Carruthers and Mark Thomas	
2006	"You're All I Have"	Barnaby Roper	
2006	"You're All I Have"	David Goyer	
2006	"Chasing Cars"	Nick Brandt (US version)^{[D]}	
2006	"Chasing Cars"	Arni & Kinski (UK version)^{[E]}	
2006	"Chasing Cars"	Arni & Kinski (Grey's Anatomy version)^{[F]}	
2006	"Hands Open"	Patrick Daughters	
2006	"Set the Fire to the Third Bar" (featuring Martha Wainwright)	Paul McGuigan	
2007	"Open Your Eyes"	Robert Hales	
2007	"Shut Your Eyes"	Mark Thomas	
2007	"Signal Fire"	Paul McGuigan	
2008	"Take Back the City"^{[B]}	Alex Courtès	
2008	"Crack the Shutters"	Kevin Godley	
2009	"If There's a Rocket Tie Me to It"^{[B]}	Daniel Brereton	
2009	"The Lightning Strike"	Blue Leach	
2009	"The Planets Bend Between Us"^{[G]}	Daniel Brereton	
2009	"Just Say Yes"^{[D]}	Blue Leach	
2011	"Called Out in the Dark"	Brett Simon	
2011	"This Isn't Everything You Are"	Brett Simon	
2012	"In the End"	Brett Simon	
2012	"New York"	Brett Simon	
2018	"Don't Give In"	Brett Simon	
2018	"Life On Earth"	Brett Simon	
2018	"What If This Is All The Love You Ever Get?"	Brett Simon	
2018	"Empress"	Brett Simon	
2018	"Life And Death"	Richard Davis	
2018	"A Dark Switch"	Brett Simon	
2018	"A Youth Written In Fire"	Brett Simon	
2018	"Wild Horses"	Brett Simon	
2018	"Soon"	Brett Simon	
2024	"All"	Edie Amos	

Notes

- A Video uses the "Phil Vinall Mix" of the song
- B Video uses the "Radio Edit" of the song
- C Video uses the "AAA Mix" of the song
- D Video uses an edit of the song
- E Video uses a remix of the song
- F Video uses the 'Arni & Kinski' version with scenes added from Grey's Anatomy
- G Video uses the "Single Version" of the song

== Other appearances ==
Year	Song	Album/Single	Notes
2000	"Post Punk Progression"	La Roc Rocs	Revamped version appeared as a B-side to "Run" Also appears on Up To Now compilation.
2000	"When I Get Home for Christmas"	It's a Cool Cool Christmas	Original song written in the Jeepster era
2004	"Do They Know It's Christmas?"	Do They Know It's Christmas?	Charity single by Band Aid 20
2004	"How to be Dead"	One in Four	Compilation album in aid of The Scottish Association for Mental Health
2005	"Crazy in Love"	Cosmosonica – Tom Middleton Presents Crazy Covers Vol. 1 Up to Now	Beyoncé Knowles cover, also appeared as B-side to "Spitting Games" (re-release)
2006	"I Am an Astronaut"	Colours Are Brighter	Ricky Wilde cover, also appeared as B-side to "Open Your Eyes"
2007	"Signal Fire"	Spider-Man 3: The Official Soundtrack	Original song, appears during the end of the film
2007	"Isolation"	Instant Karma: The Amnesty International Campaign to Save Darfur	John Lennon cover
2007	"Comeback Girl" (Snow Patrol Remix)	Comeback Girl	Song by Republic of Loose. Snow Patrol has remixed the song, and does not perform on it
2010	"Unknown Caller" (Snow Patrol Remix)	Artificial Horizon	Song by U2. Snow Patrol has remixed the song, and does not perform on it
2011	"May You Never"	Johnny Boy Would Love This (A Tribute to John Martyn)	
2013	"When Love Breaks Down"	I Give It a Year: The Original Motion Picture Soundtrack	
2014	"I Won't Let You Go"	Divergent: Original Motion Picture Soundtrack	
