= List of Snow Patrol band members =

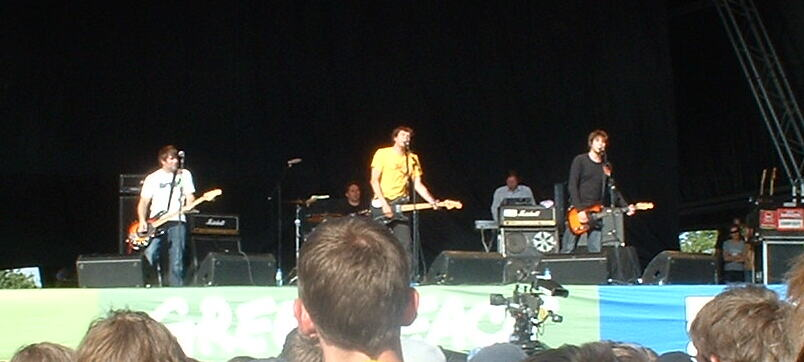
left to right: Mark McClelland, Jonny Quinn, Gary Lightbody, Tom Simpson and Nathan Connolly

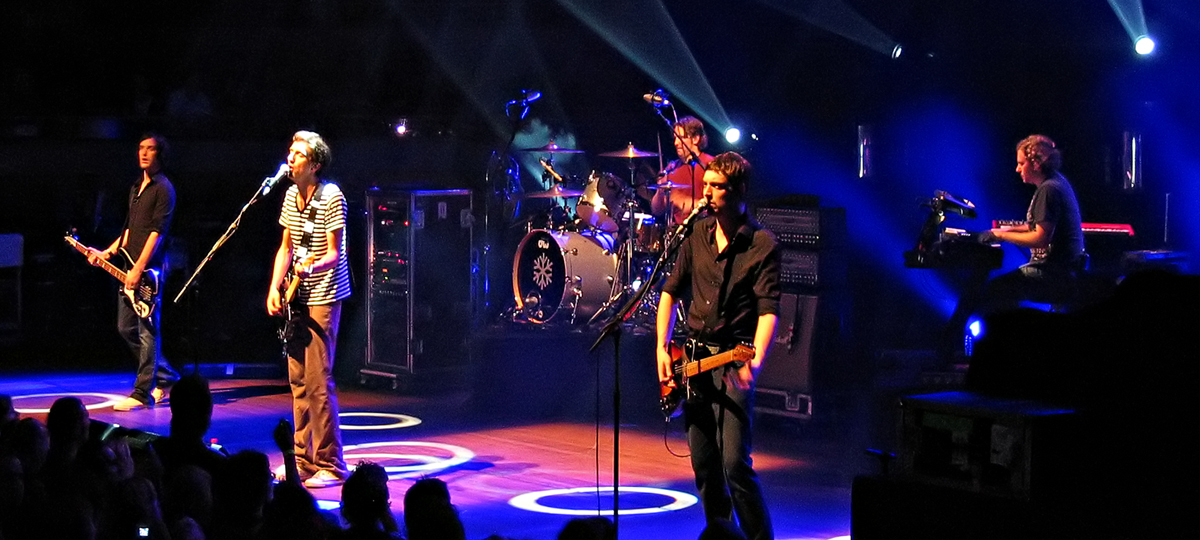
left to right: Paul Wilson, Gary Lightbody, Jonny Quinn, Nathan Connolly and Tom Simpson

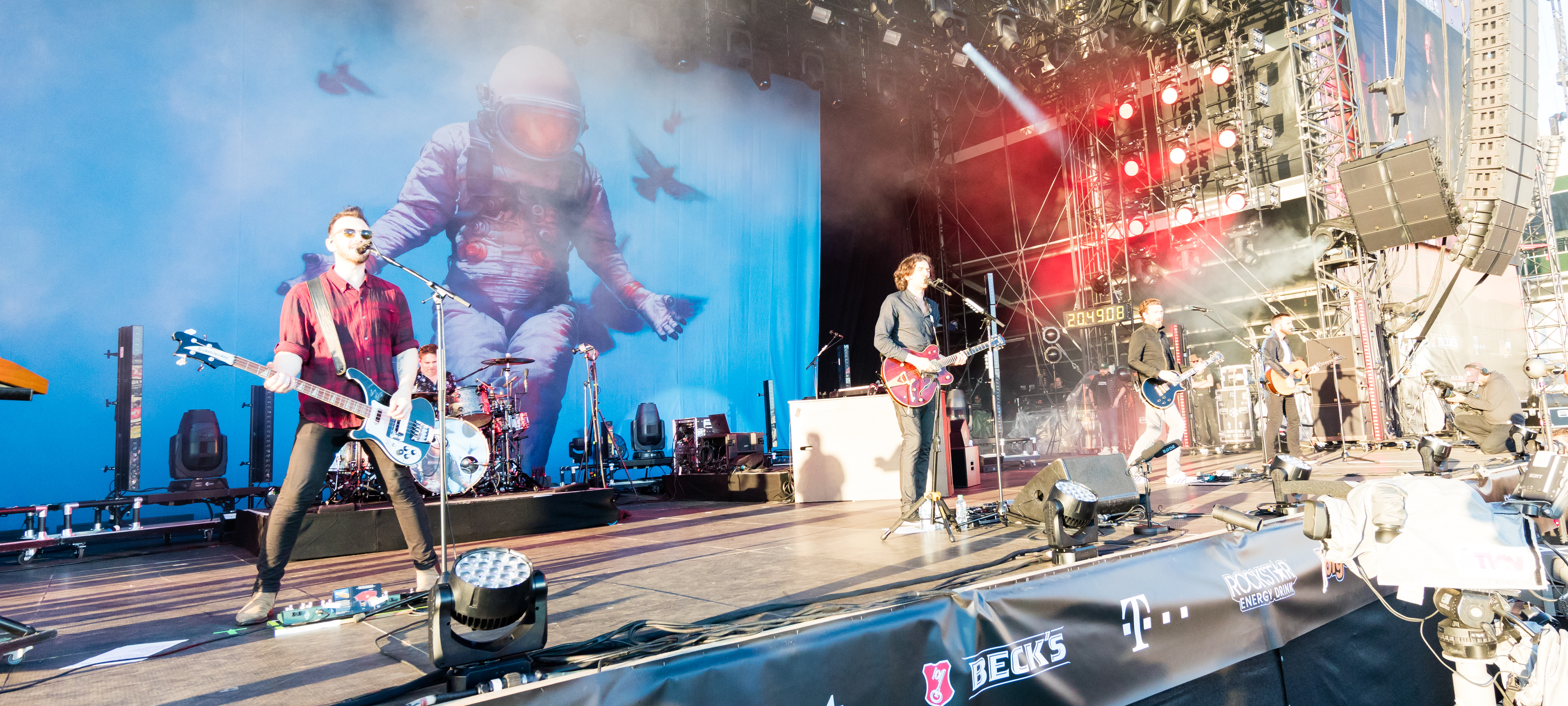
left to right: Paul Wilson, Jonny Quinn, Gary Lightbody, Nathan Connolly and Johnny McDaid

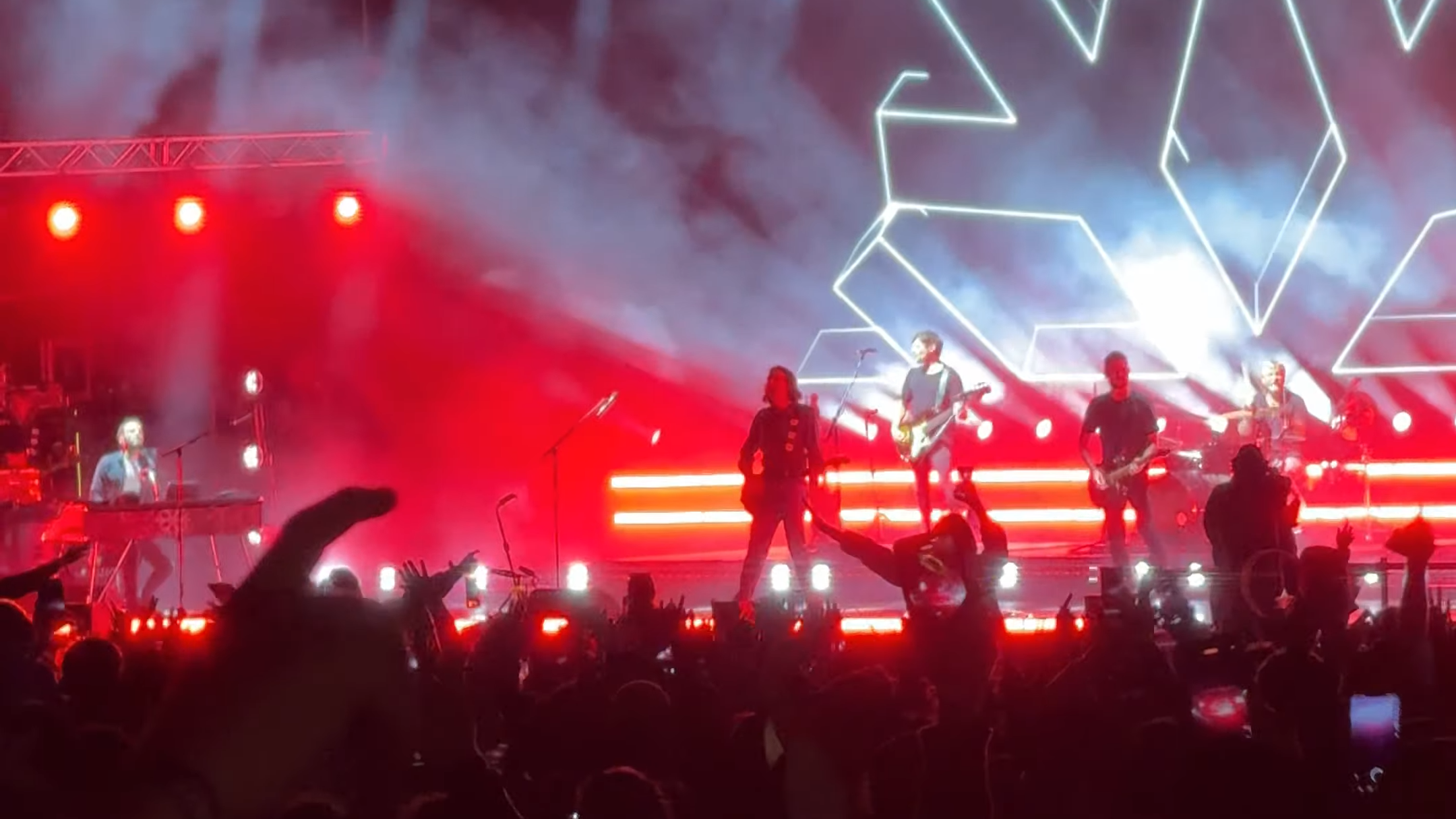
left to right: Johnny McDaid, Gary Lightbody, Ben Epstein, Nathan Connolly and Ash Soan

Four line-ups of Snow Patrol performing in 2004, 2009, 2018 and 2024

Snow Patrol are a Northern Irish–Scottish rock band formed in 1994 in Dundee, Scotland by Gary Lightbody (vocals, guitar, keyboards), Mark McClelland (bass, keyboards), and Michael Morrison (drums) under the name Shrug. The band currently consists of Lightbody, guitarist Nathan Connolly (since 2002), pianist/guitarist Johnny McDaid (since 2011) and touring members Ben Epstein (bass) and Ash Soan (drums) (both since 2024).

== History ==
Snow Patrol were formed in early 1994 by University of Dundee students Gary Lightbody, Mark McClelland, and Michael Morrison under the name Shrug. In 1996, they changed their name to Polarbear to avoid clashing with any American bands that were also named Shrug. Shortly afterwards, drummer Michael Morrison left the group after suffering a breakdown and returned to Northern Ireland.

The drummer position was briefly filled by Richard Colburn, before Jonny Quinn joined as full time drummer. In 2001, the band were joined on tour by songwriter Iain Archer, who performed guitar and backing vocals. In 2002, Archer was replaced by Nathan Connolly who became an official member. The band parted ways with McClelland, he was replaced by Paul Wilson who had previously toured with the band on guitar and keyboards. The band also added long-time touring keyboardist Tom Simpson as an official member.

In 2007, Quinn was briefly replaced by Graham Hopkins (ex-Therapy?) after the drummer broke his arm. Guitar tech Troy Stewart also played additional guitars from 2008 to 2013. In 2008, the band were re-joined by Colburn, who played percussion and keyboards from 2008 to 2009. On the band's reworked tour in 2009, they were joined by Ruth O’Reilly on French horn and Stella Page on violin, they were also briefly re-joined by Archer after Connolly suffered nerve damage.

In 2011, the band were joined by Jonny McDaid on piano and guitar, initially as a guest musician, playing on Fallen Empires (2011) and it's tour, and later as a full-time member. Tom Simpson left the band in August 2013. This band's line-up stayed stable for 10 years.

In 2019, the band did another reworked tour, featuring many additional musicians, Archer and Colburn both returned, alongside Miriam Kaufmann (keys, glockenspiel, vocals) who had toured with the band between 2006 and 2013, O’Reilly and Page, both returned alongside trumpeter, Colm MacAthlaoich, second violinist Jote Osahn, violaist Vince Greene and cellist Ivan Hussey.

In 2023, the band parted ways with both Quinn and Wilson, Quinn departed due to tensions with McDaid, and Wilson to focus on his heavy metal project, Above as Below.

== Members ==
=== Current ===
Image	Name	Years active	Instruments	Studio release contributions
	Gary Lightbody	1994–present	lead vocals; guitar; keyboards and piano (1994–2005)	all releases
	Nathan Connolly	2002–present	guitar; backing vocals	all releases from Final Straw (2003) onwards
	Johnny McDaid	2011–present	piano; guitar; keyboards; programming; backing vocals	all releases from Fallen Empires (2011) onwards

=== Former ===
Image	Name	Years active	Instruments	Studio release contributions
	Mark McClelland	1994–2005	bass; keyboards; piano; backing vocals	all releases until Final Straw (2003)
	Michael Morrison	1994–1996	drums; percussion	The Yogurt vs. Yogurt Debate (1995)
	Jonny Quinn	1997–2023	drums; percussion	all releases from Songs for Polarbears (1998) to Wildness (2018)
	Tom Simpson	2005–2013 (touring 1996–2005)	keyboards; piano; samples	all releases from Eyes Open (2006) to Fallen Empires (2011)
	Paul Wilson	2005–2023 (touring 2000–2005)	bass (2005–2023); guitar (2000–2005); backing vocals; additional keyboards	all releases from Eyes Open (2006) to Wildness (2018)

=== Session/touring ===
Image	Name	Years active	Instruments	Studio release contributions
	Richard Colburn	1996–1997; 2008–2009; 2019	percussion; drums (1996–1997, 2019); keyboards (1996–1997, 2008–2009)	Starfighter Pilot (1997); Songs for Polarbears (1998); When It's All Over We Still Have to Clear Up (2001)
	Iain Archer	2001–2002; 2009; 2019	guitars; lap steel guitar; backing vocals	Final Straw (2003); Eyes Open (2006)
	Colm MacAthlaoich	2001–2002; 2019	trumpet	none
	Miriam Kaufmann	2006–2007; 2008–2012; 2019	backing vocals; keyboards; glockenspiel	none
	Graham Hopkins	2007	drums	none
	Troy Stewart	2008–2013	additional guitars	none
	Ruth O’Reilly	2009; 2019	french horn; backing vocals	none
	Stella Page	2009; 2019	violin; backing vocals	none
	Jote Osahn	2019	violin; backing vocals	none
	Vince Greene	2019	viola	none
	Ivan Hussey	2019	cello	none
	Ben Epstein	2024–present	bass; backing vocals	The Forest Is the Path (2024)
	Ash Soan	2024–present	drums	The Forest Is the Path (2024)

== Line-ups ==
Period	Members	Studio releases
early 1994 – late 1996	Gary Lightbody – vocals, guitar, keyboards; Mark McClelland – bass, keyboards, backing vocals; Michael Morrison – drums	The Yogurt vs. Yogurt Debate (1995)
late 1996 – mid 1997	Gary Lightbody – vocals, guitar, keyboards; Mark McClelland – bass, keyboards, backing vocals; Tom Simpson – keyboards, piano, samples (touring); Richard Colburn – drums, keyboards (session/touring)	Starfighter Pilot (1997); Songs for Polarbears (1998) one track
mid 1997 – early 2001	Gary Lightbody – vocals, guitar, keyboards; Mark McClelland – bass, keyboards, backing vocals; Tom Simpson – keyboards, piano, samples (touring); Jonny Quinn – drums, percussion	Songs for Polarbears (1998) remaining tracks; When It's All Over We Still Have to Clear Up (2001)
March 2001 – spring 2002	Gary Lightbody – vocals, guitar, keyboards; Mark McClelland – bass, keyboards, backing vocals; Tom Simpson – keyboards, piano, samples (touring); Jonny Quinn – drums, percussion; Iain Archer – guitar, backing vocals (touring)	
spring 2002 – March 2005	Gary Lightbody – vocals, guitar, keyboards; Mark McClelland – bass, keyboards, backing vocals; Tom Simpson – keyboards, piano, samples (touring); Jonny Quinn – drums, percussion; Nathan Connolly – guitar, backing vocals	Final Straw (2003); Sessions@AOL (2004)
March 2005 – mid 2011	Gary Lightbody – vocals, guitar; Tom Simpson – keyboards, piano, samples; Jonny Quinn – drums, percussion; Nathan Connolly – guitar, backing vocals; Paul Wilson – bass, backing vocals, keyboards	Live and Acoustic at Park Ave (2005); Eyes Open (2006); A Hundred Million Suns (2008)
mid 2011 – August 2013	Gary Lightbody – vocals, guitar; Tom Simpson – keyboards, piano, samples; Jonny Quinn – drums, percussion; Nathan Connolly – guitar, backing vocals; Paul Wilson – bass, backing vocals, keyboards; Johnny McDaid – piano, guitar, keyboards, backing vocals	Fallen Empires (2011)
August 2013 – September 2023	Gary Lightbody – vocals, guitar; Jonny Quinn – drums, percussion; Nathan Connolly – guitar, backing vocals; Paul Wilson – bass, backing vocals, keyboards; Johnny McDaid – piano, guitar, keyboards, backing vocals	Wildness (2018)
late 2023 – present	Gary Lightbody – vocals, guitar; Nathan Connolly – guitar, backing vocals; Johnny McDaid – piano, guitar, keyboards, backing vocals; Ben Epstein – bass, backing vocals (session/touring); Ash Soan – drums (session/touring)	The Forest Is the Path (2024)
