= One Hundred Things You Should Have Done in Bed =

Single by Snow Patrol

from the album Songs for Polarbears
- B-side: "My Last Girlfriend"; "T.M.T."; "I Could Stay Away Forever"
- Released: 11 May 1998
- Studio: Chamber, Edinburgh
- Genre: Indie rock
- Length: 2:11
- Label: Jeepster
- Songwriters: Gary Lightbody and Mark McClelland
- Producer: Jamie Watson

Snow Patrol singles chronology
"Little Hide" (1997)	"One Hundred Things You Should Have Done in Bed" (1998)	"Velocity Girl / Absolute Gravity" (1998)

"One Hundred Things You Should Have Done in Bed" is the second single by Northern Irish alternative rock band Snow Patrol, released on 11 May 1998 and included on their debut album, Songs for Polarbears (1998). The song peaked in the United Kingdom at number 157, becoming the first single by the band to chart.

== Track listing ==
7" vinyl

A: "One Hundred Things You Should Have Done in Bed" – 2:11
B: "My Last Girlfriend" – 2:59

Maxi CD

1. "One Hundred Things You Should Have Done in Bed" – 2:11
2. "My Last Girlfriend" – 2:59
3. "T.M.T" – 2:51
4. "I Could Stay Away Forever" – 4:30
5. "One Hundred Things You Should Have Done in Bed" (Video)

The video for "One Hundred Things You Should Have Done in Bed" was uncredited. It was not mentioned in the artwork.

== Charts ==
Chart performance for "One Hundred Things You Should Have Done in Bed"
Chart (1998)	Peak position
UK Singles (Official Charts Company)	157
UK Indie (OCC)	35
