= Little Hide =

Single by Snow Patrol

from the album Songs for Polarbears
- B-side: "Sticky Teenage Twin"; "Limited Edition"; "Jj"
- Released: 16 February 1998
- Studio: Chamber, Edinburgh
- Genre: Indie rock, alternative rock
- Length: 2:41
- Label: Jeepster
- Songwriters: Gary Lightbody and Mark McClelland
- Producer: Jamie Watson

Snow Patrol singles chronology
"Little Hide" (1998)	"One Hundred Things You Should Have Done in Bed" (1998)

"Little Hide" is the debut single by Northern Irish alternative rock band Snow Patrol, released on 16 February 1998 and included on their debut album, Songs for Polarbears (1998). It is notable for being the first release by Snow Patrol for the label.

== Voice message ==
The single was the first release by the band under the name "Snow Patrol" after changing from "Polarbear" due to copyright issues.

The actual voice message concerning this name change can be heard at the start of the song "Little Hide":

Hi Gary. Hi Jonny. Err Mark here. Just calling up because I've just been speaking to Rankin and he's going to send me a fax tomorrow that he's received from America regarding the use of the name Polarbear. They want to sue us or make sure that we basically don't ever use the name again. But I'll speak to you later about this. Sorry to drop the bombshell.

== Release and reception ==
The single was issued in two formats, Maxi CD and 7" vinyl. It received mixed reviews from critics, earning 2 and a half stars from AllMusic's Nitsuh Abebe, who called the songs "competent". The single sold poorly and failed to chart.

== Track listing ==
- 7" vinyl

A: "Little Hide" – 2:41
B: "Sticky Teenage Twin" – 2:08

- Maxi CD
1. "Little Hide" – 2:41
2. "Sticky Teenage Twin" – 2:08
3. "Limited Edition" – 2:33
4. "Jj" – 1:47
5. "Little Hide" (video)

The video for "Little Hide" was uncredited. It was not mentioned in the artwork.
