= Starfighter Pilot (song) =

- CD I

Single by Snow Patrol

from the album Songs for Polarbears
- B-side: "Raze the City"; "Riot, Please"
- Released: 28 June 1999
- Recorded: 1997
- Studio: Chamber, Edinburgh
- Genre: Indie rock, alternative rock
- Length: 3:40
- Label: Jeepster
- Songwriters: Gary Lightbody and Mark McClelland
- Producer: Jamie Watson

Snow Patrol singles chronology
"Velocity Girl / Absolute Gravity" (1998)	"Starfighter Pilot" (1999)	"Ask Me How I Am" (2000)

Alternative cover
- CD II, Promo

"Starfighter Pilot" is the fourth single by Northern Irish alternative rock band Snow Patrol, released on 28 June 1999 as the final single of their debut album, Songs for Polarbears (1998). The lyrics were written by lead singer Gary Lightbody and the music was composed by him and the other two members of Snow Patrol at the time, Mark McClelland and Jonny Quinn. The song reached number 161 on the UK Singles Chart.

== Background ==
"Starfighter Pilot" was originally released under Snow Patrol's former name Polarbear in 1997. The song was described by The Times as "a wonky indie number that is refreshingly rough around the edges". Irish Central called it a "dirty glam masterpiece". Drummer Jonny Quinn remembers it to be the first Snow Patrol song he listened to on the radio, back in 1998 in a cafe in Ireland. He found the experience "chilling".

During the Reworked Tour of November–December 2009, the band started playing the song again. Lightbody said that the song had lost all meaning to them, and playing it felt as if the band was at a "loss for anything important to say". However, he has stated that he has started to like the song again.

== Release and reception ==
Magazine clipping advertising the release of the singles.

The single was released on 28 June 1999 in two versions. The first version was backed with 2 new songs as b-sides. These songs would later be re-released as bonus tracks on the 2006 re-release of Songs for Polarbears.

The second version contained 3 remixes of the song: "The Bad Belle Mix", "Cut La Roc Mix", and "Steve Hitchcock Mix". The "Bad Belle Mix" was remixed by the band's longtime friend Richard Colburn, who previously had played drums on their first release, the EP Starfighter Pilot. DJ Cut La Roc and Steve Hitchcock remixed the other two tracks. Lightbody would go on to collaborate with Cut la Roc on a song "Fallen" in 2001, which would later be released as a single.

The single peaked at 161 on the UK Singles Chart, remaining a firm favourite of older fans and was included on the band's 2009 compilation Up to Now.

== Track listing ==
- CD I
1. "Starfighter Pilot" (Radio Mix) – 3:40
2. "Raze the City" – 4:21
3. "Riot, Please" – 2:52
- CD II
1. "Starfighter Pilot (The Bad Belle Mix) – 4:29
2. "Starfighter Pilot (Cut La Roc Mix) – 3:59
3. "Starfighter Pilot (Steve Hitchcock Mix) – 3:09
- Promo (12" vinyl)

A: "Starfighter Pilot" (Cut La Roc Mix) – 3:59
A: "Starfighter Pilot" (The Bad Belle Mix) – 4:29
B: "Starfighter Pilot" (Twin Tub Re-Score)
B: "Starfighter Pilot" (Steve Hitchcock Mix) – 3:09
B: "Starfighter Pilot" (Radio Mix) – 3:40

== Charts ==
Chart performance for "Starfighter Pilot"
Chart (1999)	Peak position
UK Singles (Official Charts Company)	161
UK Indie (Official Charts)	28
