= Velocity Girl / Absolute Gravity =

- 7" Vinyl

Single by Snow Patrol

from the album Songs for Polarbears
- B-side: "When You're Right, You're Right (Darth Vader Bringing In His Washing Mix)"
- Released: 9 November 1998
- Studio: Chamber, Edinburgh
- Genre: Indie rock
- Length: 4:36 ("Velocity Girl"); 3:57 (Sell Out Edit); 2:50 ("Absolute Gravity")
- Label: Jeepster
- Songwriter: Snow Patrol
- Producer: Jamie Watson

Snow Patrol singles chronology
"One Hundred Things You Should Have Done in Bed" (1998)	"Velocity Girl / Absolute Gravity" (1998)	"Starfighter Pilot" (1998)

Alternative Covers
- CD cover

"Velocity Girl" / "Absolute Gravity" is the third single by Northern Irish alternative rock band Snow Patrol, released on 9 November 1998 as a double A-side and included on their debut album, Songs for Polarbears (1998). The song peaked at number 177 in the United Kingdom.

== Track listing ==
- 7" vinyl

A: "Velocity Girl" – 4:36
A: "Absolute Gravity" – 2:50

- Maxi CD
1. "Velocity Girl– (Sell Out Edit) – 3:57
2. "Absolute Gravity" – 2:50
3. "When You're Right, You're Right" (Darth Vader Bringing in His Washing Mix) – 3:31

== Charts ==
Chart performance for "Velocity Girl" / "Absolute Gravity"
Chart (1998)	Peak position
UK Singles Chart	177
