= Final Straw Tour =

2003–05 concert tour by Snow Patrol

- Tour by Snow Patrol
- Poster advertising Snow Patrol's first ever Australian shows of 27–28 July 2004
- Location: Asia; Australia; Europe; North America
- Associated album: Final Straw
- Start date: 10 August 2003
- End date: 23 July 2005
- Legs: 13
- No. of shows: 223 (14 cancelled)

Snow Patrol concert chronology
- Final Straw Tour (2003–2005); Eyes Open Tour (2006–2007)

The Final Straw Tour was a concert tour by Northern Irish alternative rock band Snow Patrol in support of their third album, Final Straw (2003). The band visited numerous venues internationally from 2003 through 2005. The tour is the collective name of many smaller tours and festivals Snow Patrol has played in support of their album. The tour commenced on 13 July 2003, spanned 13 legs and saw the band play over 200 shows, visiting four continents in the process.

The band toured as both, a headlining and a support act, supporting bands like U2, Pixies, Athlete and Grandaddy during the tour. The Australian mini-tour of July 2004 marked the first time the band played in the country. Before the final leg of the tour, bassist Mark McClelland left the band. Replacement Paul Wilson, formerly of Terra Diablo, and then-touring keyboardist Tom Simpson subsequently made their live debuts as permanent members of the band. Snow Patrol's only DVD, Live at Somerset House was released from this tour.

The last leg of the tour saw the band support U2 on the Vertigo Tour. Snow Patrol chose to end the touring, which had spanned almost two years, after the U2 dates in a bar owned by actor Eddie Murphy. The full tour spanned 223 dates and had 14 cancellations.

== Tickets ==
For the UK Tour in January 2004, where the band supported Athlete, tickets for the Nottingham and London dates sold out early. Tickets for the Preston, Glasgow and Cambridge shows could be obtained from Wayahead (now called See Tickets). Tickets for the Nottingham and York shows could be purchased from Gigsandtours and those for the show at Reading University had to be obtained in person (at the university) or online through Wegottickets.

For the UK Tour in March 2004, where the band was supported throughout by Terra Diablo and Astrid, tickers for all dates except Sheffield, Stoke and Norwich were available through phone or online at Wayahead and the tickets for the Sheffield show through phone or online at Ticketweb. Tickets for the shows at Stoke and Norwich could only be obtained through phone. Additional dates for Leeds, Liverpool and Dublin were later added. Tickets for the Leeds and Liverpool shows could be obtained through phone or Wayahead. Tickets for the Dublin date were available through phone or Ticketweb.

Snow Patrol did a short tour of the United States to promote Final Straw. Tickets for each show could be obtained only through the venue website, or phone. Snow Patrol appeared on the "Carling Live New Kings of Rock 'n' Roll" series, where they supported Jet. Tickets for this show were not available for sale to the general public, they could only be won from Carlinglive. The band played a lone date supporting the Pixies in the Netherlands. Tickets for this date could be obtained from the Dutch Ticketmaster website. The band played two sideshows when they visited Australia to play at Splendour at the Grass. Tickets for the shows were available from Frontiertouring.

Tickets for the charity event Soccer Six were available through Xfm, or by phone, through the Soccer Six Ticket Hotline or the Reading Ticket Hotline. Tickets for Live 8 were free. To give away the tickets, a lottery was organized through SMS on 6 June. Tickets were only available to people who won the text lottery, which took place on 6 June. Snow Patrol played a one-off show at the Boule Noir in March. Tickets for the show were available from Ticketnet. Tickets for the Isle of Wight Festival could be purchased from Ticketmaster, or the official website for the festival. Tickets for T in the Park could be obtained through the official website also. For the V Festival went on general sale on 20 March 9 am and could be purchased through the official website or Gigsandtours. Again, the Oxegen Festival tickets were available through the official website. For Splendour in the Grass, tickets went on sale on 7 May. Tickets for the Arran Special Easter Gigs sold out quickly. No additional tickets were made available. When the gigs were rescheduled to a single show in Glasgow, fans were offered a refund.

Tickets for the one-off year rounding show at the RDS Main Hall went on sale on 2 October 2004 at 9 am. They were priced at €34.50 each. The Hogmanay Party required passes to get in. They went on sale on 13 November 2004, 10 am and were priced at £2.50 each and were limited to a maximum of four per household. They can be bought by credit and debit card via a hotline, from Ticketmaster centres, or Virgin Mega stores in Argyle Street and Buchanan Street. Online, they could be purchased from Ticketmaster. Later, Snow Patrol's official website notified fans about a limited number of remaining tickets, which could be purchased from Ticketweb. Tickets for the show at the Killarney Festival were available from Ticketmaster, and were priced between €44.50 and €49.50. Tickets for the Isle of Wight Festival went on sale from the official website and were priced at £35 (Day ticket) and £90 (Weekend pass). They could also be ordered through phone on the NME Ticketline.

For the tour of the US and Canada in April–May 2004, tickets for selected venues were available from the venue website. Tickets could also be obtained through various services like Ticketmaster, Tickets, Ticketweb, Ticketswest and Nextticketing. The band returned to the United States in September–October 2004. This time, the band's website offered fans the opportunity of a pre-sale before tickets went for general sale. During the tour, the band sold out the concert at the Gypsy Tea Room of capacity 897, making it the first time a show at the venue was sold out in six months.

Snow Patrol ended 2004 with a tour of UK & Ireland. Fans were again given the opportunity of a pre-sale. General sale tickets could then be purchased from Seetickets. Extra dates were later added to the tour, and tickets for the new shows went for sale after the first show in each city sold out. After all dates were sold out, an extra date was added to the Dublin gig. To give away tickets for this show, Snow Patrol's official website offered a pre-sale on 12 August, with tickets going on general sale two days after from Ticketmaster. The tickets were priced at €26.50 each. As there was still huge demand for tickets, the band added a third date at the Ulster Hall/ Tickets for this show went for pre-sale on 27 August 9:30am, with the pre-sale password being placed on the forum half an hour before the pre-sale. General sale began a day after from Ticketmaster. Tickets were priced at £16.50 (standing) and £17.50 (seated).

== UK Tour (Leg I) ==
Snow Patrol began touring for Final Straw by doing a 15 date tour of the UK. The first single taken from the album, "Spitting Games" was released during the tour. The band played at the T on the Fringe Festival during the tour. Terra Diablo acted as support act on all dates.

Tour dates

| Date | City | Country | Venue |
Support act: Terra Diablo
| 10 August 2003 | Peterborough | England | The Met Lounge |
| 11 August 2003 | Derby | England | Victoria Inn |
| 12 August 2003 | Cambridge | England | Boat Race |
| 13 August 2003 | Northampton | England | The Soundhaus |
| 15 August 2003 | Rugeley | England | Rose Theatre |
| 16 August 2003 | Bristol | England | The Louisiana |
| 18 August 2003 | Cardiff | England | Barfly Club |
| 19 August 2003 | Wolverhampton | England | The Little Civic @ Wolverhampton Civic Hall |
| 20 August 2003 | Middlesbrough | England | The Cornerhouse |
| 23 August 2003 | Dundee | Scotland | The Reading Rooms |
| 24 August 2003 | Aberdeen | Scotland | Lava (Now Kef) |
| 26 August 2003 | York | England | Fibbers |
| 27 August 2003 | Ashton-under-Lyne | England | The Witchwood |
| 28 August 2003 | Whitehaven | England | Civic Hall |

== Irish Tour ==
Snow Patrol next toured Ireland in the end of September. They supported Travis on the last date on the tour.

Tour dates

| Date | City | Country | Venue |
|---|---|---|---|
| 30 September 2003 | Sligo | Ireland | McGarrigles |
| 1 October 2003 | Galway | Ireland | Warwick Club |
| 2 October 2003 | Limerick | Ireland | Dolans Pub |
| 3 October 2003 | Cork | Ireland | The Old Oak |
| 4 October 2003 | Waterford | Ireland | The Kings |
| 5 October 2003 | Dublin | Ireland | Whelan's Pub |
| 7 October 2003 | Dundalk | Ireland | The Spirit Store |
| 8 October 2003 | Belfast | Northern Ireland | Empire Music Hall |
| 9 October 2003 | Derry | Northern Ireland | Nerve Center |
Headlining act: Travis
| 13 October 2003 | Belfast | Northern Ireland | Ulster Hall |

== Grandaddy Tour ==
The band toured as a support act for Grandaddy over two legs. They played the headlining Spitting Games Tour after the first, where they headlined all the dates. The second leg of Grandaddy Tour began after the Spitting Games Tour ended.

Tour dates

| Date | City | Country | Venue |
Leg I
| 7 November 2003 | Glasgow | Scotland | Glasgow Academy |
| 8 November 2003 | Manchester | England | Manchester Academy |
| 10 November 2003 | Leeds | England | Leeds Metropolitan University |
| 11 November 2003 | Wolverhampton | England | Wulfrun Hall |
| 12 November 2003 | Newcastle | England | Newcastle University |
Leg II
| 7 December 2003 | Brighton | England | Corn Exchange |
| 8 December 2003 | Norwich | England | The Waterfront |
| 9 December 2003 | Portsmouth | England | The Pyramids |
| 10 December 2003 | London | England | Brixton Academy |

== Spitting Games Tour ==
Snow Patrol undertook a headlining tour, dubbed the Spitting Games Tour after supporting Grandaddy for a few dates on their UK Tour. After finishing the tour, the band supported them again for a few dates.

Tour dates

| Date | City | Country | Venue |
|---|---|---|---|
| 21 November 2003 | Scarborough | England | The Kasbah |
| 22 November 2003 | Sunderland | England | Bar 36 |
| 24 November 2003 | Derby | England | Victoria Inn |
| 25 November 2003 | Sheffield | England | Fez Club |
| 26 November 2003 | Stratford-upon-Avon | England | Cox's Yard |
| 28 November 2003 | Blackwood | Wales | Miner's Institute |
| 29 November 2003 | Milford Haven | Wales | The Imperial |
| 30 November 2003 | Swansea | Wales | Swansea University |
| 1 December 2003 | Bournemouth | England | The Villa |
| 2 December 2003 | Exeter | England | Cavern Club |
| 3 December 2003 | Reading | England | Fez Club |
| 4 December 2003 | High Wycombe | England | The White Horse |
| 6 December 2003 | Aldershot | England | West End Centre |

== UK Tour (Leg II) ==
Snow Patrol supported Athlete on their UK Tour to kick off touring for the year 2004.

Tour dates

| Date | City | Country | Venue |
Headlining act: Athlete
| 23 January 2004 | Reading | England | Reading University |
| 25 January 2004 | Cambridge | England | Cambridge Corn Exchange |
| 26 January 2004 | York | England | Barbican Centre |
| 28 January 2004 | Nottingham | England | Rock City |
| 29 January 2004 | Glasgow | Scotland | Carling Academy |
| 30 January 2004 | Preston | England | Guildhall & Carter Theatre |
| 31 January 2004 | London | England | Brixton Academy |

== North American Tour (Leg I) ==
Ahead of Final Straw seeing an official release in the United States, Snow Patrol did a short tour in February 2004 and played a select few shows to promote the album. This marked the first time the band had toured the United States. The ended up touring the US and Canada four times during the Final Straw Tour.

Tour dates

| Date | City | Country | Venue |
Short tour to promote Final Straw
| 16 February 2004 | Cambridge | United States | T.T. the Bears |
| 17 February 2004 | New York City | United States | Mercury Lounge |
| 19 February 2004 | San Francisco | United States | 330 Ritch |
| 20 February 2004 | West Hollywood | United States | The Troubadour |
| 23 February 2004 | Los Angeles | United States | Spaceland |

== UK Tour (Leg III) ==
Snow Patrol undertook another UK Tour in March as a headlining act, with Terra Diablo and Astrid acting as support on all dates. The last show at the Shepherd's Bush Empire was a part of BBC 6 Music's Live at Two programme. "How to Be Dead" made its live debut on 14 April as a fan request. However, the performance went wrong, as vocalist Gary Lightbody forgot lyrics and the band played the wrong chords.

Tour dates

| Date | City | Country | Venue |
Support acts: Terra Diablo & Astrid
| 2 March 2004 | Newcastle | England | Newcastle University |
| 3 March 2004 | Liverpool | England | Carling Academy |
| 4 March 2004 | Birmingham | England | Carling Academy Birmingham |
| 5 March 2004 | Stoke-on-Trent | England | The Sugarmill |
| 6 March 2004 | Sheffield | England | The Leadmill |
| 8 March 2004 | Manchester | England | Manchester Academy |
| 9 March 2004 | Leeds | England | Blank Canvas |
| 10 March 2004 | Leicester | England | The Princess Charlotte |
| 11 March 2004 | Norwich | England | University of East Anglia |
| 13 March 2004 | Oxford | England | Oxford Brookes University |
| 14 March 2004 | Portsmouth | England | Portsmouth Pyramids Centre |
| 15 March 2004 | Bristol | England | Bristol Academy |
| 16 March 2004 | London | England | Electric Ballroom |
| 26 March 2004 | Belfast | Northern Ireland | Mandela Hall |
| 27 March 2004 | Dublin | Ireland | Ambassador Theatre |
| 29 March 2004 | London | England | Shepherd's Bush Empire |

== North American Tour (Leg II) ==
Following the release of the album in the United States, the band toured the United States a second time, playing a further eighteen dates in April–May. They also played two shows in Canada. Carina Round supported the band on all dates. When in Seattle, the band played an intimate set for radio station KEXP, where they covered Low's "2-Step".

Tour dates

| Date | City | Country | Venue |
Support act: Carina Round
| 15 April 2004 | Atlanta | United States | Cotton Club |
| 17 April 2004 | Washington, D.C. | United States | 9:30 Club |
| 18 April 2004 | Philadelphia | United States | North Star Bar |
| 19 April 2004 | New York City | United States | Bowery Ballroom |
| 20 April 2004 | Boston | United States | Paradise Rock Club |
| 22 April 2004 | Toronto | Canada | Lee's Palace |
| 24 April 2004 | Detroit | United States | The Shelter |
| 25 April 2004 | Chicago | United States | The Empty Bottle |
| 26 April 2004 | Minneapolis | United States | Ascot Room |
| 1 May 2004 | Vancouver | Canada | Richard's on Richards |
| 2 May 2004 | Seattle | United States | KEXP Studio |
| 2 May 2004 | Seattle | United States | The Crocodile |
| 3 May 2004 | Portland | United States | Berbati's Pan |
| 5 May 2004 | San Francisco | United States | Slim's |
| 6 May 2004 | Los Angeles | United States | The Troubadour |
| 7 May 2004 | Los Angeles | United States | The Troubadour |
| 8 May 2004 | San Diego | United States | The Epicentre |

== European tour ==
Snow Patrol undertook a small tour of Europe in May. After finishing this tour, the band appeared at various rock festivals held throughout the world. The show in Amsterdam was cancelled, and rescheduled to 21 January, at a nearby venue.

Tour dates

| Date | City | Country | Venue |
|---|---|---|---|
| ~~26 May 2004~~ | ~~Amsterdam~~ | ~~Netherlands~~ | ~~The Melkweg~~ (CANCELLED) |
| 28 May 2004 | Cologne | Germany | Underground |
| 29 May 2004 | Frankfurt | Germany | Cafe Nachtleben |
| 30 May 2004 | Berlin | Germany | Knaack club |
| 31 May 2004 | Munich | Germany | Atomic Café |
| 3 June 2004 | Madrid | Spain | Moby Dick Club |

== North American Tour (Leg III) ==
Snow Patrol returned to the United States in September, this time doing a bigger tour and playing lot more dates. During the tour, they played at the Voodoo Experience Festival. Eisley toured with the band as a support act on all dates. One day before starting the tour, on 2 September, the band appeared on Late Show with David Letterman as musical guests. The first two dates of the tour had to be cancelled because of Hurricane Frances. The show in Sacramento, California was cancelled to give the band time to prepare for an appearance on The Late Late Show (CBS) on 5 October.

Tour dates

| Date | City | Country | Venue |
Support act: Eisley
| ~~3 September 2004~~ | ~~Fort Lauderdale~~ | ~~United States~~ | ~~Culture Room~~ (CANCELLED) |
| ~~4 September 2004~~ | ~~St. Petersburg~~ | ~~United States~~ | ~~State Theatre~~ (CANCELLED) |
| 7 September 2004 | Atlanta | United States | Cotton Club |
| 8 September 2004 | Norfolk | United States | The NorVA |
| 10 September 2004 | Washington, D.C. | United States | 9:30 Club |
| 11 September 2004 | Providence | United States | The Call |
| 13 September 2004 | Boston | United States | Paradise Rock Club |
| 14 September 2004 | New York City | United States | Irving Plaza |
| 17 September 2004 | Toronto | Canada | The Opera House |
| 18 September 2004 | Detroit | United States | St. Andrews Hall |
| 19 September 2004 | Columbus | United States | Newport Music Hall |
| 20 September 2004 | Chicago | United States | Metro |
| 22 September 2004 | Minneapolis | United States | Fine Line Music Cafe |
| 23 September 2004 | Lawrence | United States | The Bottleneck |
| 24 September 2004 | Denver | United States | Bluebird Theater |
| 28 September 2004 | Vancouver | Canada | Richard's on Richards Cabaret |
| 29 September 2004 | Seattle | United States | The Showbox |
| 30 September 2004 | Portland | United States | Aladdin Theater |
| 2 October 2004 | San Francisco | United States | The Fillmore |
| ~~3 October 2004~~ | ~~Sacramento~~ | United States | ~~Harlow Night Club~~ (CANCELLED) |
| 5 October 2004 | Los Angeles | United States | Avalon |
| 6 October 2004 | San Diego | United States | Canes Bar & Grill |
| 8 October 2004 | Tempe | United States | Marquee Theatre |
| 9 October 2004 | Tucson | United States | Plush |
| 11 October 2004 | Austin | United States | La Zona Rosa |
| 12 October 2004 | Houston | United States | Meridian |
| 13 October 2004 | Dallas | United States | The Gypsy Tea Room |
| 16 October 2004 | Birmingham | United States | Zydeco |

== How to Be Dead Tour ==
Snow Patrol did a year finishing tour on home soil to end 2004. The shows sold out quickly. Due to demand, an additional date was later added, and the tour then began on the 22nd, instead of the 25th. Support acts were announced. Later, the "French Kicks" had to pull out, and "Laeto" were announced as their replacement for the remaining shows. This leg of the tour was dubbed the "How to Be Dead Tour".

Tour dates

| Date | City | Country | Venue | Support act(s) |
|---|---|---|---|---|
| 22 November 2004 | Belfast | Northern Ireland | Ulster Hall | The Zutons & Rilo Kiley |
| 23 November 2004 | Belfast | Northern Ireland | Ulster Hall | The Zutons |
| 24 November 2004 | Dublin | Ireland | Olympia Theatre | The Zutons & Rilo Kiley |
| 25 November 2004 | Dublin | Ireland | Olympia Theatre | The Zutons & Rilo Kiley |
| 27 November 2004 | Birmingham | England | Birmingham Academy | Rilo Kiley |
| 28 November 2004 | Birmingham | England | Birmingham Academy | French Kicks & Rilo Kiley |
| 29 November 2004 | Brixton | England | Brixton Academy | The Secret Machines & Rilo Kiley |
| 30 November 2004 | Brixton | England | Brixton Academy | — |
| 15 December 2004 | Southampton | England | Guildhall | Morning Runner & The Ghears |
| 16 December 2004 | Manchester | England | Manchester Apollo | Seafood & Laeto |
| 17 December 2004 | Manchester | England | Manchester Apollo | Delays & Laeto |
| 19 December 2004 | Glasgow | Scotland | The Barrowlands | Delays & Laeto |
| 20 December 2004 | Glasgow | Scotland | The Barrowlands | Delays & Laeto |
| 21 December 2004 | Glasgow | Scotland | The Barrowlands | Eugene Kelly & Laeto |
| 22 December 2004 | Belfast | Northern Ireland | Ulster Hall | Eugene Kelly & Iain Archer |
| 23 December 2004 | Belfast | Northern Ireland | Ulster Hall | Iain Archer & The Ghears |

== North American Tour (Leg IV) ==
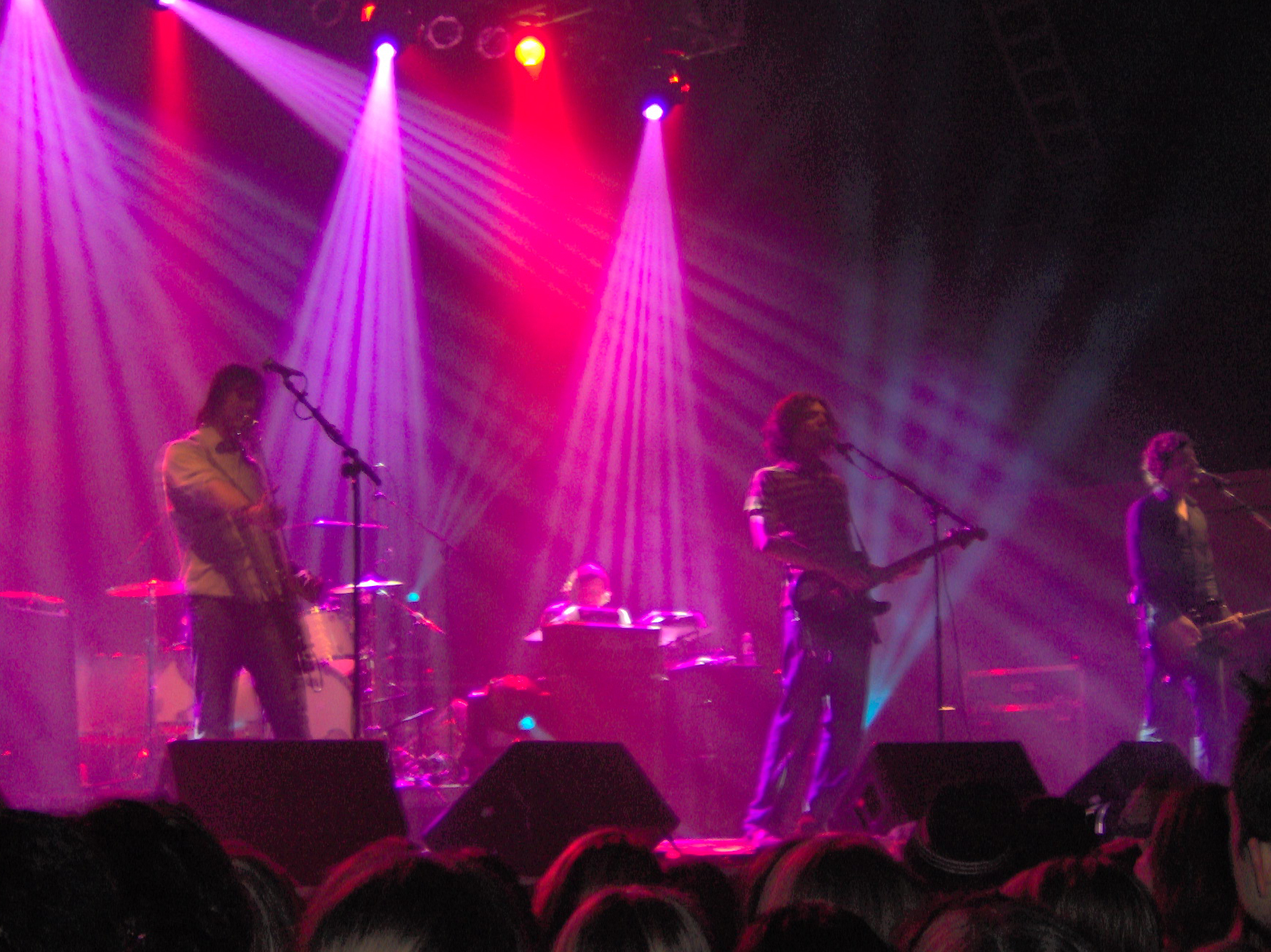
Snow Patrol at the Roseland Ballroom on 20 May 2005.

Snow Patrol toured the United States and Canada again in spring 2005. Embrace and Athlete were the support acts for the first and second half of the tour respectively. The tour included two intimate in-store performances; at Sam Goody and at Park Ave. record store. The latter was subsequently released as an EP Live and Acoustic at Park Ave.. They also did an intimate acoustic set for KFOG, performing "Wow", "Spitting Games", "Batten Down the Hatch" and "Chocolate". The rendition of "Chocolate" was later included on the KFOG Live from the Archives Vol. 15 compilation.

Tour dates

| Date | City | Country | Venue |
Support acts: Embrace & Athlete
| 23 April 2005 | The Woodlands | United States | Cynthia Woods Mitchell Pavilion |
| 24 April 2005 | Austin | United States | Cynthia Stubbs's Bar-B-Q |
| 25 April 2005 | Dallas | United States | Gypsy Tea Room |
| 26 April 2005 | Tulsa | United States | Cain's Ballroom |
| 2 May 2005 | San Francisco | United States | KFOG PlaySpace |
| 2 May 2005 | San Francisco | United States | Warfield Theatre |
| 3 May 2005 | Portland | United States | Crystal Ballroom |
| 4 May 2005 | Seattle | United States | Moore Theatre |
| 6 May 2005 | Vancouver | Canada | Vogue Theatre |
| 8 May 2005 | Calgary | Canada | MacEwan Hall Ballroom |
| 10 May 2005 | Minneapolis | United States | The Quest |
| 11 May 2005 | Minneapolis | United States | Sam Goody (In-store) |
| 12 May 2005 | Chicago | United States | The Vic Theatre |
| 18 May 2005 | Toronto | Canada | Kool Haus |
| 19 May 2005 | Montreal | Canada | Cabaret La Tulipe |
| 20 May 2005 | New York City | United States | Roseland Ballroom |
| 23 May 2005 | Norfolk | United States | The NorVA |
| 24 May 2005 | Washington, D.C. | United States | 9:30 Club |
| 26 May 2005 | Atlanta | United States | Roxy Theatre |
| 27 May 2005 | Winter Park | United States | Park Ave. CDs (In-store) |
| 27 May 2005 | Lake Buena Vista | United States | House of Blues |
| 28 May 2005 | Fort Lauderdale | United States | Culture Room |
| 29 May 2005 | St. Petersburg | United States | State Theatre |
| 31 May 2005 | New Orleans | United States | House of Blues |

== One-off shows ==
On 2 November, Snow Patrol played one show supporting Biffy Clyro on their Gonzo tour. A few days later, they played a show in the Liquid Rooms, Edinburgh to celebrate the MTV EMA's coming to Edinburgh. The band played a show for the Carling Live supporting Jet. The show showcased twelve bands that had made their presence felt during 2003. The band returned to the venue for an exclusive session for Xfm a couple of months later. The band returned the Liquid Rooms in December to play a special "Christmas Boardies show". The show was held as a "thank you" to the fans who had helped the band on tour as their street team. The band played a small show in Paris at "La Boule Noire", a small concert hall of a capacity of 300. Snow Patrol played a one-off show at the RDS Main Hall to "round a year to remember". They ended 2004 by playing at the Hogmanay Party, held annually on 31 December. The band did a one-off show in Amsterdam which was the original show at "The Melkweg", which got rescheduled. This show became their first in 2005. It was also made available as a free webcast.

Tour dates

| Date | City | Country | Venue |
|---|---|---|---|
| 2 November 2003 | Glasgow | Scotland | The Barfly |
| 5 November 2003 | Edinburgh | Scotland | MTV EMA 2003 @ The Liquid Rooms |
| 21 December 2003 | Edinburgh | Scotland | Christmas Boardies show @ The Liquid Rooms |
| 11 February 2004 | London | England | NME Brat Awards @ The Astoria |
| 26 February 2004 | Islington | England | Carling Live New Kings of Rock and Roll @ Carling Academy |
| 2 April 2004 | Islington | England | O_{2} Academy Islington |
| 30 March 2004 | Paris | France | La Boule Noire |
| 29 December 2004 | Dublin | Ireland | RDS Main Hall |
| 31 December 2004 | Glasgow | Scotland | Hogmanay Party @ George Square |
| 21 January 2005 | Amsterdam | Netherlands | The Paradiso |

=== Special Easter gigs ===
Snow Patrol were to play two special Easter gigs at the Brodick Town Hall and Whiting Bay Hall, Isle of Arran in April. They were the headlining act, with Terra Diablo and Weevil acting as support. The shows were sold out, but the shows were cancelled. Lamlash Hall was announced as the new venue and tickets sold were allowed for the new venue. The first gig was to take place on 10 April. Gary Lightbody and Tom Simpson were also scheduled to DJ after the first show.

The rescheduled shows though, had to be cancelled. Lightbody explained:

We're really disappointed that we are unable to play on Arran. These shows were booked before we released "Run", and things have obviously gone a bit mad for us since then. The local Police on Arran now think that they will have a mini Woodstock on their hands and the conditions they have imposed on us at this late stage make it impossible to play there. We hope that everyone who planned to go to Arran will be able to make it to the new show at the QMU, and we'll do our best to make sure that it's a brilliant show – we may even throw a few surprises into the set.

The gigs were rescheduled to a single show at QMU, Glasgow on 11 April.

Tour dates

| Date | City | Country | Venue |
Support acts: Terra Diablo & Weevil
| ~~10 April 2004~~ | ~~Isle of Arran~~ | ~~Scotland~~ | ~~Brodick Town Hall~~ (CANCELLED) |
| ~~11 April 2004~~ | ~~Isle of Arran~~ | ~~Scotland~~ | ~~Whiting Bay Hall~~ (CANCELLED) |
| ~~10 April 2004~~ | ~~Isle of Arran~~ | ~~Scotland~~ | ~~Lamlash Hall~~ (CANCELLED) |
| ~~11 April 2004~~ | ~~Isle of Arran~~ | ~~Scotland~~ | ~~Lamlash Hall~~ (CANCELLED) |
| 11 April 2004 | Glasgow | Scotland | The QMU |

== Festivals ==
Before the tour began, Snow Patrol played at the T in the Park and Witnness festivals. The band's first festival on tour was T on the Fringe, during their first UK Tour of the Final Straws promotion. They also played the SXSW in the United States, which saw them supporting The Polyphonic Spree. The band later played at a number of rock festivals throughout June, July and August. This included playing the Grolsch Summer Set at the Somerset House in London. This performance was recorded and made its way to a DVD called Live at Somerset House. During the band's US Tour in September–October, they played at the Voodoo Experience festival. Some dates in mid-October had to be cancelled as singer Lightbody was ill because of fatigue and the doctor had advised him to rest. The band made it to the V Festival in a week. Guitarist Nathan Connolly has called V 2004 as his worst moment on tour, having gotten drunk out of excitement of playing at the event, and forgetting songs during the band's set. In 2005, the band played at the "Coachella Festival" as a support act and the "Isle of Wight Festival", where they were headliners on the final day. In July, the band played at the Killarney Festival.

Tour dates

| Date | City | Country | Venue |
|---|---|---|---|
| 12 July 2003 | Kinross | Scotland | T in the Park @ Balado Airfield |
| 13 July 2003 | Naas | Ireland | Witnness 2003 @ Punchestown Racecourse |
| 22 August 2003 | Edinburgh | Scotland | T on the Fringe Festival |
| 19 March 2004 | Austin, Texas | United States | SXSW @ Austin Convention Center |
| 13 June 2004 | Isle of Wight | England | Isle of Wight Festival @ Seaclose Park |
| 17 June 2004 | Hultsfred | Sweden | Hultsfred Festival @ Lake Hulingen |
| 20 June 2004 | Venice | Italy | Heineken Jammin' Festival @ Imola Autodrome |
| 25 June 2004 | Pilton | England | Glastonbury Festival @ Worthy Farm |
| 26 June 2004 | Scheeßel | Germany | Hurricane Festival @ Eichenring Motorcycle Speedway |
| 27 June 2004 | Tuttlingen | Germany | Southside Festival |
| 5 July 2004 | Kristiansand | Norway | Quart Festival |
| 10 July 2004 | Kildare | Ireland | Oxegen Festival @ Punchestown Racecourse |
| 11 July 2004 | Kinross | Scotland | T in the Park @ Balado Airfield |
| 25 July 2004 | Byron Bay | Australia | Splendour in the Grass @ Belongil Fields |
| 31 July 2004 | Niigata | Japan | Fuji Rock Festival @ Naeba Ski Resort |
| 6 August 2004 | Benicàssim | Spain | Benicàssim International Festival |
| 8 August 2004 | London | England | Grolsch Summer Set @ Somerset House |
| ~~13 August 2004~~ | ~~Salzburg~~ | ~~Austria~~ | ~~Frequency Festival~~ (CANCELLED) |
| ~~14 August 2004~~ | ~~Erfurt~~ | ~~Germany~~ | ~~Highfield Festival~~ (CANCELLED) |
| ~~15 August 2004~~ | ~~Weeze~~ | ~~Germany~~ | ~~Terramoto Festival~~ (CANCELLED) |
| ~~17 August 2004~~ | ~~Paredes de Coura~~ | ~~Portugal~~ | ~~Paredes de Coura Festival~~ (CANCELLED) |
| ~~19 August 2004~~ | ~~Kiewit-Hasselt~~ | ~~Belgium~~ | ~~Pukkelpop~~ (CANCELLED) |
| ~~20 August 2004~~ | ~~Biddinghuizen~~ | ~~Netherlands~~ | ~~Lowlands Festival~~ (CANCELLED) |
| 21 August 2004 | Weston | England | V Festival @ Weston Park |
| 22 August 2004 | Chelmsford | England | V Festival @ Hylands Park |
| 15 October 2004 | New Orleans | United States | Voodoo Music Experience |
| 30 April 2005 | Indio | United States | Coachella Festival @ Empire Polo Fields |
| 12 June 2005 | Isle of Wight | England | Isle of Wight Festival @ Seaclose Park |
| 1 July 2005 | Killarney | England | Killarney Music Festival @ Fitzgerald Stadium |

=== Side shows ===
After the band's performance at the "Quart Festival", the band played one show in Amsterdam supporting the Pixies on their European Tour.

Tour date

| Date | City | Country | Venue |
Headlining act: Pixies
| 6 July 2004 | Amsterdam | Netherlands | Heineken Music Hall |

After the band's performance at "Splendour in the Grass", the band played two side-shows in Australia before heading to Japan for the "Fuji Rock Festival". The band was supported by Keane on both dates. The 'mini-tour' is notable for being the first shows the band played in Australia.

Tour dates

| Date | City | Country | Venue |
Support act: Keane
| 27 July 2004 | Sydney | Australia | The Gaelic Club |
| 28 July 2004 | Melbourne | Australia | The Hi-Fi |

== Charity events ==
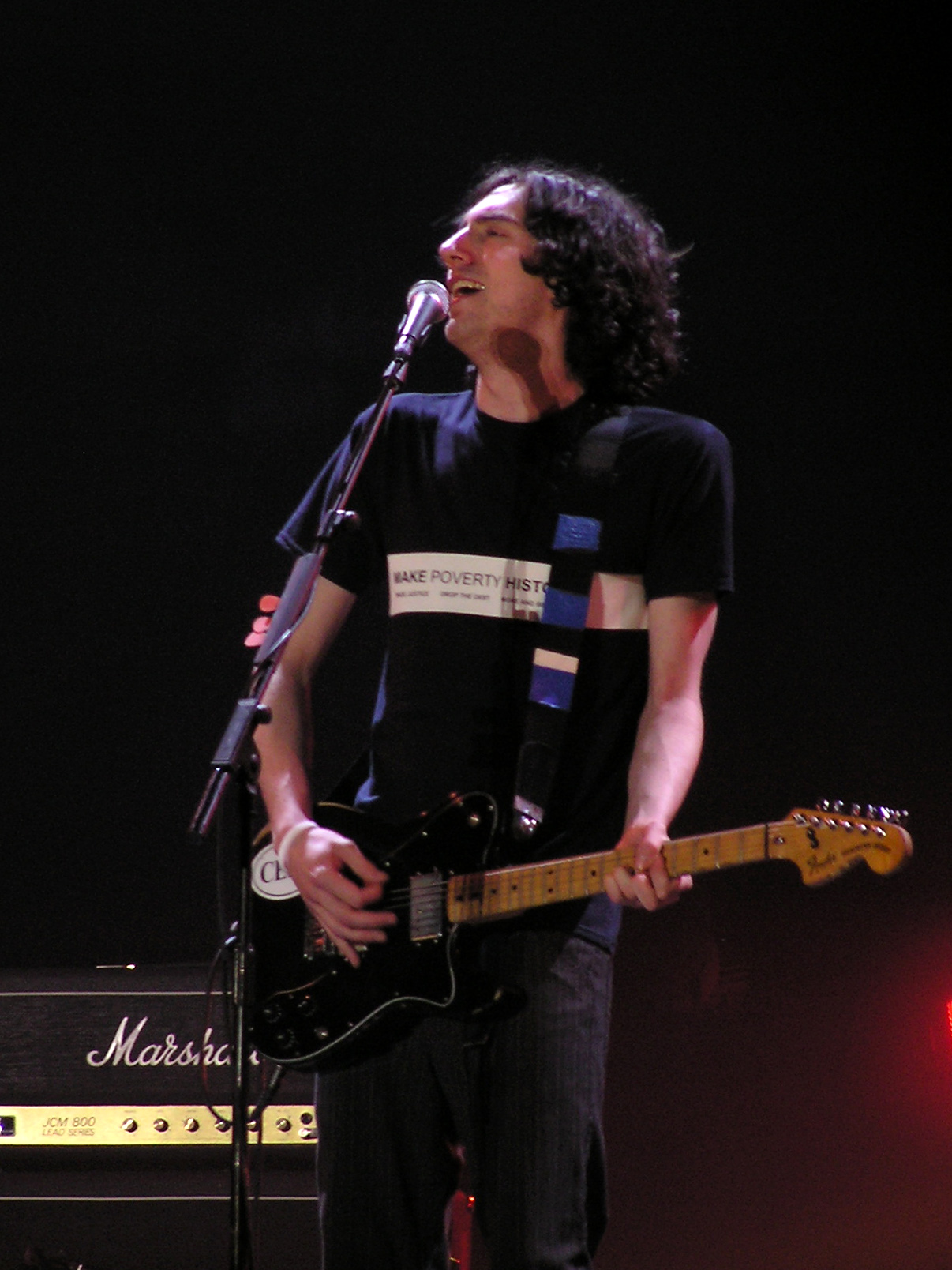
Gary Lightbody at the Tsunami Relief concert on 22 January 2005.

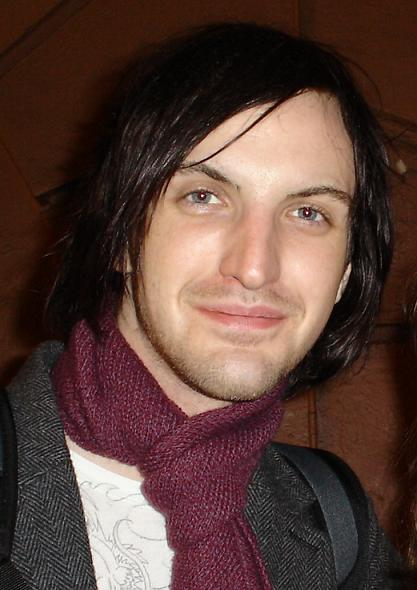
Bassist Paul Wilson's first concert with Snow Patrol was a charity event at Hillgrove Hotel.

On 23 May 2004, Snow Patrol played football along with members of The Darkness, Starsailor and Goldie Lookin Chain for the 10th annual "Soccer Six". The event was held in aid of The Prince's Trust and Give a Child a Chance. The event was held at Reading F.C.'s Madejski Stadium. In November 2004, the band played a short 20-minute set as part of BBC's Children in Need. The performance of "Run" was televised during BBC's coverage of the event. In January 2005, Snow Patrol played a charity concert in Cardiff in aid of the victims of the tsunami disaster of 2004.

In April 2005, Snow Patrol played two charity shows in one day in Dingle to raise money for some local charities. This show marked the live debut of Paul Wilson, replacement for bassist Mark McClelland, who was fired from the band in mid-March. The show is also notable for being the first where touring keyboardist Tom Simpson played as an official band member. The first show (for all ages) began at 5 in the evening, and the second (for over-18s) began at 10. Lightbody also DJed after the second show. New songs like "Your Halo" "Chasing Cars" and "It's Beginning to Get to Me" got played live the first time, and received good reviews from NME. The band played two concerts at Live 8, a string of benefit concerts organized by Bob Geldof. The first of these was on 2 July 2005 in London and the second was in Edinburgh a few days later.

Tour dates

| Date | City | Country | Venue |
|---|---|---|---|
| 19 November 2004 | Stirling | Scotland | Children in Need @ Stirling Castle |
| 22 January 2005 | Cardiff | Wales | Tsunami Relief Cardiff @ Millennium Stadium |
| 1 April 2005 | Dingle | Ireland | Hillgrove Hotel (All ages) |
| 1 April 2005 | Dingle | Ireland | Hillgrove Hotel (18+ only) |
| 2 July 2005 | London | England | Live 8 @ Hyde Park |
| 6 July 2005 | Edinburgh | Scotland | Live 8: The Final Push @ Murrayfield Stadium |

== Supporting U2 and end of tour ==
U2's lead singer Bono is a huge fan of the band, and was "desperate" for Snow Patrol to support them on the Vertigo Tour. The band was in talks with U2 for eight months, and they finally opened for them on eight dates on the European leg of the tour in June–July 2005.

Tour dates

| Date | City | Country | Venue |
|---|---|---|---|
| 10 June 2005 | Brussels | Belgium | King Baudouin Stadium |
| 14 June 2005 | Manchester | England | City of Manchester Stadium |
| 24 June 2005 | Dublin | Ireland | Croke Park |
| 7 July 2005 | Berlin | Germany | Olympiastadion |
| 9 July 2005 | Paris | France | Stade de France |
| 10 July 2005 | Paris | France | Stade de France |
| 15 July 2005 | Amsterdam | Netherlands | Amsterdam Arena |
| 16 July 2005 | Amsterdam | Netherlands | Amsterdam Arena |

Touring for Final Straw officially ended on 23 July 2005. This was revealed by Gary Lightbody in his blog on Snow Patrol's official website:

"As you may or may not know we have finally finished touring Final Straw. Our last show was in Thomastown, Co. Kilkenny, Ireland in Eddie Murphy's bar on Saturday the 23rd of July. It took place in a little marquee in the beer garden out the back and was a great way to end two years on the road."

— Gary Lightbody

== Typical set lists ==
1. "Wow"
2. "Gleaming Auction"
3. "Whatever's Left"
4. "How to Be Dead"
5. "Chocolate"
6. "An Olive Grove Facing the Sea"
7. "Same"
8. "Somewhere a Clock is Ticking"
9. "Ways & Means"
10. "Run"
11. "Spitting Games"
12. "Post Punk Progression"
13. "Tiny Little Fractures"
- Set list at the Shepherd's Bush Empire concert
  on 29 March 2004.
1. "Wow"
2. "Gleaming Auction"
3. "One Night is Not Enough"
4. "How to Be Dead"
5. "An Olive Grove Facing the Sea"
6. "Chocolate"
7. "Same"
8. "Somewhere a Clock is Ticking"
9. "Ways & Means"
10. "Run"
11. "Black and Blue"
12. "Spitting Games"

Encore

13. "Post Punk Progression"
14. "Crazy in Love"
15. "Tiny Little Fractures"
- Set list at the O_{2} Academy Islington concert
  on 2 April 2004.
1. "Wow"
2. "Gleaming Auction"
3. "Spitting Games"
4. "One Night is Not Enough"
5. "How to Be Dead"
6. "You Are My Joy"
7. "Chocolate"
8. "An Olive Grove Facing the Sea"
9. "Same"
10. "Somewhere a Clock is Ticking"
11. "Ways & Means"
12. "Run"
13. "Black and Blue"

Encore

14. "Post Punk Progression"
15. "Tiny Little Fractures"
- Set list at the Somerset House concert
  on 8 August 2004.
