= Starfighter Pilot =

EP by Polarbear
- Released: 15 June 1997
- Recorded: Chamber Studios, Edinburgh
- Genre: Alternative rock; Indie rock
- Length: 8:21
- Label: Electric Honey
- Producer: Jamie Watson

Polarbear chronology
The Yogurt vs. Yogurt Debate (1995)	Starfighter Pilot (1997)	Songs for Polarbears (1998)

Starfighter Pilot is an EP by Northern Irish alternative rock band Snow Patrol, released on 15 June 1997 through Electric Honey. The EP was released under the name Polarbear, the band's second name after Shrug. The name Polarbear was later changed to Snow Patrol because the band discovered the existence of another band with that name.

== Information ==
The song "Starfighter Pilot" was later featured on the band's debut album, Songs for Polarbears (1998) and was later released as the fourth and final single of the album.

The EP remains a rare find and is popular among collectors. The song "Holy Cow" later appeared as a bonus track on the U.S. release of "Songs for Polarbears". The song "Safety" though, has not been released anywhere else, nor has the EP been re-issued.

== Track listing ==
1. "Starfighter Pilot" - 3:21
2. "Holy Cow" - 1:54
3. "Safety" - 3:06

== Personnel ==
Polarbear

- Gary Lightbody - vocals, guitar
- Mark McClelland - bass guitar, keyboards

Other personnel

- Richard Colburn - drums, keyboards
- Stuart Murdoch - vocals, wooden flute, piano on track 3
- Jamie Watson - producer, engineer
- David McClelland - photography
- Ross Wilson - photography
- Divine Inc. - artwork
