= Songs for Polarbears =

Studio album by Snow Patrol
- Released: 31 August 1998
- Recorded: 1996–1997
- Studio: Chamber Studios, Edinburgh
- Genre: Indie rock; noise pop; alternative rock
- Length: 49:49
- Label: Jeepster (UK); Never (US)
- Producer: Jamie Watson

Snow Patrol chronology
Starfighter Pilot (1997)	Songs for Polarbears (1998)	When It's All Over We Still Have to Clear Up (2001)

Singles from Songs for Polarbears
- 1. "Little Hide" Released: 16 February 1998; 2. "One Hundred Things You Should Have Done in Bed" Released: 11 May 1998; 3. "Velocity Girl / Absolute Gravity" Released: 9 November 1998; 4. "Starfighter Pilot" Released: 28 June 1999

Professional ratings
Review scores
Source	Rating
AllMusic	3.5/5 stars
NME	8/10
Pitchfork Media	8.1/10
PopMatters	7/10
Rolling Stone	3.5/5 stars

Songs for Polarbears is the debut studio album by Northern Irish alternative rock band Snow Patrol, released on 31 August 1998 in the United Kingdom, and 12 October in the United States.

The album charted at #143 in the UK, and did not sell well upon its initial release. However, its re-release eventually went Gold in the UK.

== Background ==
The band was listening to a diverse range of music at the time, with the majority of it being American rock like Pixies, Soundgarden and Dinosaur Jr. Other acts included My Bloody Valentine, and Super Furry Animals' first album Fuzzy Logic. All these influences resulted in a musically diverse album that incorporated styles like hip hop, drone, and Pavement-style indie rock. The album title is a reference to the band's previous name Polarbear.

== Track listing ==
All lyrics are written by Gary Lightbody; all music is composed by Gary Lightbody and Mark McClelland.

UK version
No.	Title	Length
1.	"Downhill from Here"	3:23
2.	"Starfighter Pilot"	3:19
3.	"The Last Shot Ringing in My Ears"	4:26
4.	"Absolute Gravity"	2:45
5.	"Get Balsamic Vinegar...Quick You Fool"	3:27
6.	"Mahogany"	2:46
7.	"NYC"	4:27
8.	"Little Hide"	2:41
9.	"Make Up"	2:12
10.	"Velocity Girl"	4:37
11.	"Days Without Paracetamol"	3:32
12.	"Fifteen Minutes Old"	3:08
13.	"Favourite Friend"	2:46
14.	"One Hundred Things You Should Have Done in Bed"	2:11

US version (Additional tracks)
No.	Title	Length
15.	"I Could Stay Away Forever"	4:28
16.	"Sticky Teenage Twin"	2:08
17.	"Holy Cow"	1:54
18.	"When You're Right, You're Right" (Darth Vader Bringing in His Washing Mix)	3:31

- "Marketplace" (3:48) is included as a hidden track after "One Hundred Things You Should Have Done in Bed" on both versions.

2006 re-release (Bonus tracks)
No.	Title	Length
15.	"Sticky Teenage Twin"	2:08
16.	"Limited Edition"	2:33
17.	"Jj"	1:47
18.	"My Last Girlfriend"	2:59
19.	"T.M.T."	2:51
20.	"I Could Stay Away Forever"	4:28
21.	"When You're Right, You're Right" (Darth Vader Bringing in His Washing Mix)	3:31
22.	"Raze the City"	4:20
23.	"Riot, Please"	2:52

- All bonus tracks originally appeared as B-sides to the singles released from Songs for Polarbears.

== Personnel ==
Snow Patrol

- Gary Lightbody – vocals, guitar, keyboards, drums on "Riot, Please"
- Mark McClelland – bass guitar, keyboards
- Jonny Quinn – drums

Other personnel

- Richard Colburn – drums, keyboards on track 2
- Isobel Campbell – vocals on track 7
- Fraser Simpson – guitar on track 11

== Charts ==
Chart performance for Songs for Polarbears
Chart (1998–2006)	Peak position
Irish Albums Chart	90
UK Albums Chart	143

== Certifications ==
Certifications for Songs for Polarbears
Organization	Level	Date
BPI (UK)	Silver	3 February 2006
BPI (UK)	Gold	15 June 2007
