= Mark McClelland =

Northern Irish bassist

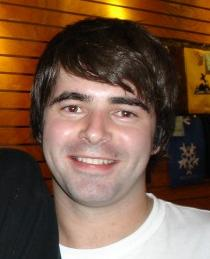
- Mark McClelland in Arizona, 2004, during the Final Straw Tour

Background information
- Born: Mark Peter McClelland; 30 March 1976 (age 49); Downpatrick, Northern Ireland
- Genres: Indie rock; alternative rock; power pop
- Occupation: Musician
- Instrument: Bass guitar
- Years active: 1994–2016
- Formerly of: Snow Patrol

Mark Peter McClelland (born 30 March 1976) is a Northern Irish musician known best as the former bass guitarist of the band Snow Patrol. McClelland is a recipient of the Ivor Novello Award for his work on the album Final Straw. He is now the bassist for alternative act Little Doses.

== Career ==
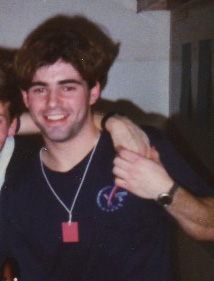
McClelland in 1994

Mark McClelland was born on 30 March 1976, and attended Sullivan Upper School as a youngster. In 1994, he started attending the University of Dundee to study Financial economics. During his first year, he founded the band Shrug with Michael Morrison and Gary Lightbody. Morrison left the band in 1995 and with new drummer Jonny Quinn, they became Polar Bear and eventually Snow Patrol. On 9 July 1998, McClelland graduated with first class honours and was one of the only three students to graduate in the course that year. Additionally, he was the only student to graduate in first class for that course that year. A few weeks later, Snow Patrol released their first studio album Songs for Polarbears (a reference to previous band name Polarbear) under Jeepster. In 2001, the band released their second studio album When It's All Over We Still Have to Clear Up. During this time, McClelland was also a member of The Reindeer Section, a Scottish ensemble started by bandmate Lightbody. He also featured on Iain Archer's album Flood The Tanks and Cut La Roc's eponymous debut album, playing the song "Post Punk Progression" with Snow Patrol.

McClelland left the band in 2005 after the success of their 2003 album Final Straw, allegedly over creative differences. Speaking to Scotland's The Daily Record at the time, McClelland claimed he was sacked as Lightbody "wanted more control and less interference", adding that Snow Patrol would effectively be a solo project now. The NME later reported that the dispute centred on songwriting credits for Final Straw, with McClelland feeling his contribution had not been given sufficient acknowledgement, even though he is credited for the music on all 12 tracks on the album.

McClelland has gone on to create Little Doses, along with girlfriend (now wife), singer Kirsten Ross and drummer Michael Branagh of Degrassi. The band is unsigned and have been largely inactive since 2016.

== Litigation ==
On 10 September 2007, the BBC news site reported that McClelland has issued a writ at the High Court in London seeking 25% of Snow Patrol's earnings since he left the band in March 2005.

== Discography ==
- Starfighter Pilot (1997)
- Songs for Polarbears (1998)
- When It's All Over We Still Have to Clear Up (2001)
- Final Straw (2003)
- Flood the Tanks
- Sessions@AOL (2004)
- La Roc Rocs (2000)
