= Snow Patrol =

Northern Irish rock band

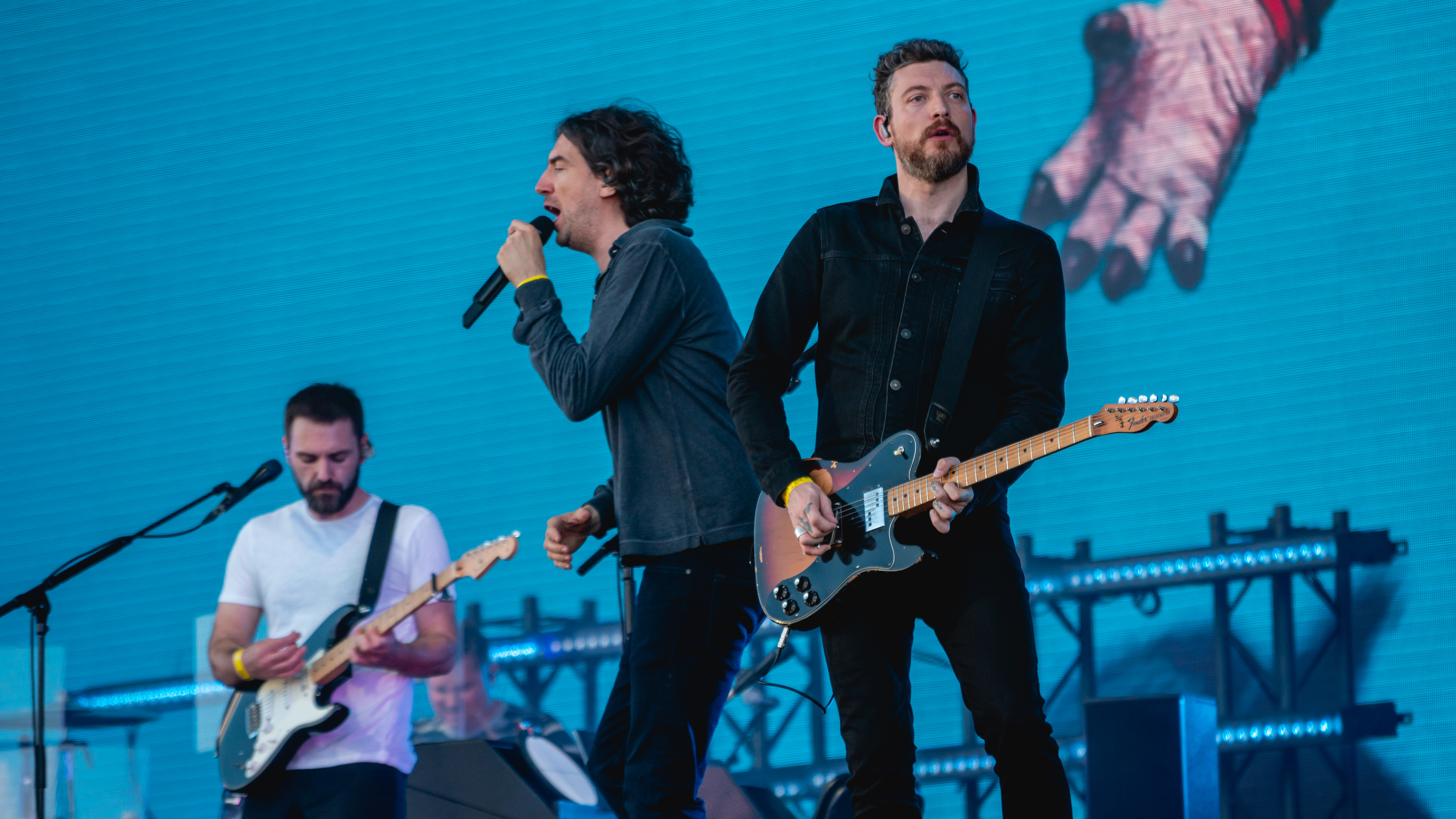
- Snow Patrol performing in 2019

Background information
- Also known as: Shrug (1994–1996); Polarbear (1996–1997)
- Origin: Dundee, Scotland
- Genres: Alternative rock; power pop; post-Britpop; indie rock
- Years active: 1994–present
- Labels: Fiction; A&M; Polydor; Geffen; Interscope; Island; Jeepster; Electric Honey
- Spinoffs: The Reindeer Section; Listen... Tanks!; Tired Pony
- Members: Gary Lightbody; Nathan Connolly; Johnny McDaid
- Past members: Mark McClelland; Michael Morrison; Jonny Quinn; Tom Simpson; Paul Wilson
- Website: snowpatrol.com

Snow Patrol are a Northern Irish rock band formed in 1994 in Dundee in Scotland, consisting of Gary Lightbody (vocals, guitar), Nathan Connolly (guitar, backing vocals), and Johnny McDaid (piano, guitar, keyboards, backing vocals); Lightbody is the band's sole remaining original member.

The group was formed in early 1994 as Shrug by University of Dundee students Lightbody, Michael Morrison, and Mark McClelland. After briefly using the name Polarbear, releasing the EP Starfighter Pilot (1997) and losing Morrison as a member, the band became Snow Patrol in 1997 and added Jonny Quinn to the lineup as drummer. Their first two studio albums, Songs for Polarbears (1998) and When It's All Over We Still Have to Clear Up (2001), released by independent record label Jeepster Records, were commercially unsuccessful. The band signed to Polydor Records, in 2002 and Connolly joined as lead guitarist.

Their major-label debut album, Final Straw, was released the following year. "Run", the record's biggest hit, saw the band rise to national fame as part of the post-Britpop movement. The album was certified 5× platinum in the UK. In 2005, McClelland left the band and was replaced by Paul Wilson. Their next studio album, Eyes Open (2006), and its hit single "Chasing Cars"—reported in 2019 to be the most-played song of the 21st century on UK radio—propelled the band to greater international fame. The album topped the UK Albums Chart and was the best-selling British record of the year. Snow Patrol released their fifth studio album, A Hundred Million Suns, in 2008; their sixth, Fallen Empires, in 2011; their seventh, Wildness, in 2018; and their eighth, The Forest Is the Path, in 2024. Quinn and Wilson left the group in 2023.

During the course of their career, Snow Patrol have won seven Meteor Ireland Music Awards and been nominated for six Brit Awards and one Grammy. Final Straw, Eyes Open, and A Hundred Million Suns have sold ten million copies worldwide, combined.

== History ==
=== Early years (1994–1997) ===
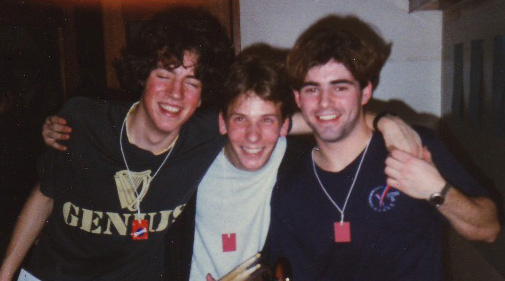
Snow Patrol originated from a band called Shrug, which formed in 1994 and consisted of Gary Lightbody, Michael Morrison, and Mark McClelland.

Snow Patrol were formed in early 1994 by University of Dundee students Gary Lightbody, Mark McClelland, and Michael Morrison, under the name Shrug. The band started by performing gigs at the university and local pubs such as Lucifer's Mill. Their first EP was entitled The Yogurt vs. Yoghurt Debate. In 1996, they changed their name to Polarbear to avoid clashing with any American bands that were also named Shrug. Shortly afterwards, drummer Michael Morrison left the group after suffering a breakdown and returned to Northern Ireland. In mid-1997, Polarbear released a three-track EP, Starfighter Pilot, on the Electric Honey label. The band was renamed Snow Patrol in 1997, because of a naming conflict with a band named Polar Bear, fronted by ex-Jane's Addiction bassist Eric Avery.

=== Songs for Polarbears and When It's All Over We Still Have to Clear Up (1997–2001) ===
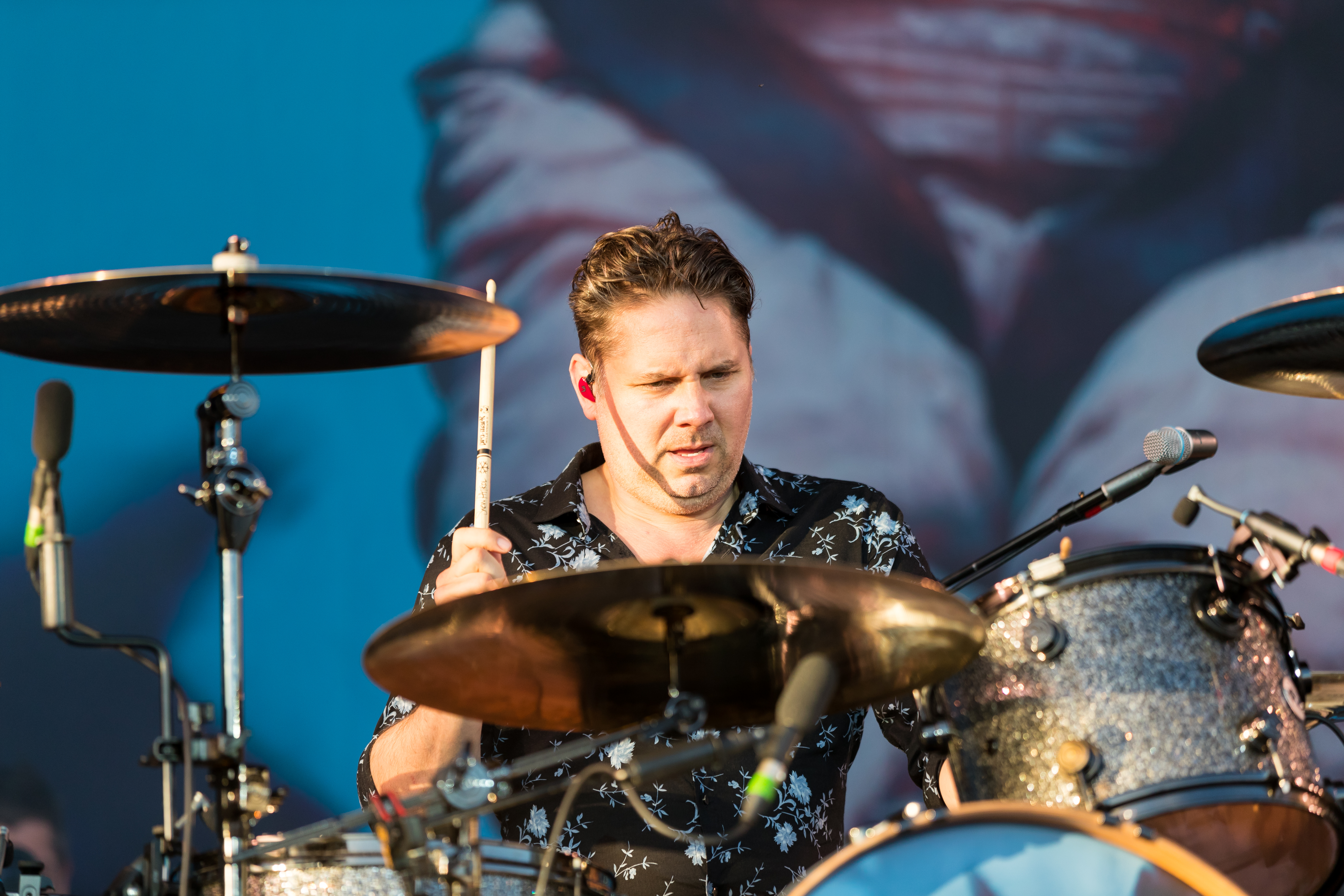
Jonny Quinn (pictured in 2018) joined as the band's drummer in 1997.

Snow Patrol joined independent label Jeepster in 1997. Jeepster had the same plan for Snow Patrol as the approach they had used with Belle & Sebastian, who became popular by word of mouth without heavy promotion. The band were happy to be associated with an indie label, because they felt it gave them greater independence. They were quoted as saying that Jeepster would not expect them to have a strict work ethic or to focus too much on promotional efforts.

Snow Patrol's debut album, Songs for Polarbears, was released in 1998 after the band had moved to Glasgow, where Lightbody was working at the Nice n Sleazy's Bar in Sauchiehall Street. The album was a critical success but did not make a commercial impact. The same year, the band came close to being featured in a worldwide advertisement for Philips, but Gomez was ultimately signed. In 1999, Snow Patrol won the "Phil Lynott Award for Best New Band" given by Irish music magazine Hot Press. In 2001, while still living in Glasgow, the trio released their next album, When It's All Over We Still Have to Clear Up. Like its predecessor, the album was praised by critics but did not sell.

The band began to work harder and tour more. They slept on fans' floors after concerts and pretended to be members of Belle & Sebastian to get into nightclubs. They owed rent to their landlords and received regular visits and letters from them while on tour. After the failure of the second album, Snow Patrol began to realise that the label's relaxed attitude towards management and record promotion, which had initially attracted them, was perhaps holding them back. The band's manager at the time, Danny McIntosh, who was described by Lightbody as "the angriest man in pop: great, great man", has said that he loved the band "with every atom in his body" and was never angry towards them. He owned a gold-coloured splitter bus, in which the band travelled to concerts. Lightbody has credited McIntosh with keeping the band together in those years.

Jeepster dropped Snow Patrol in 2001, a decision that was criticised by Hot Press magazine as brainless. By July 2001, major labels had started showing interest in the band, who were cash-strapped and had no record deal. Lightbody sold a major part of his record collection to raise money to keep the band going. The singer said this time was "miserable", but he was confident that they would get signed to another label. The music scene in the United Kingdom had turned its attention to American bands, however, and British bands were not being signed. The group spent this time writing songs. Lightbody assembled The Reindeer Section, a Scottish supergroup, and found a record label to release the project's recordings. Quinn said that although the time was hard for everyone involved except Nathan, the question of splitting never arose. It was during this time that the band wrote "Run" (which had been around since 2000) on an acoustic guitar, and it later became the band's breakthrough single. The band's "low point" came when they played a concert to eighteen people at a strip club in High Wycombe. The show took place in a shoddy VIP area, and the management had to unscrew poles used by pole dancers to make space for the band to play, something that Gary would later joke about whilst performing at a sold-out Wembley Arena. Quinn says the show was "horrendous". Desperate for attention, the band raised £200 to nominate themselves for a Mercury Prize but failed to get shortlisted.

=== Final Straw (2002–2005) ===
In 2002, Snow Patrol began to be managed and published by Jazz Summers of Big Life.

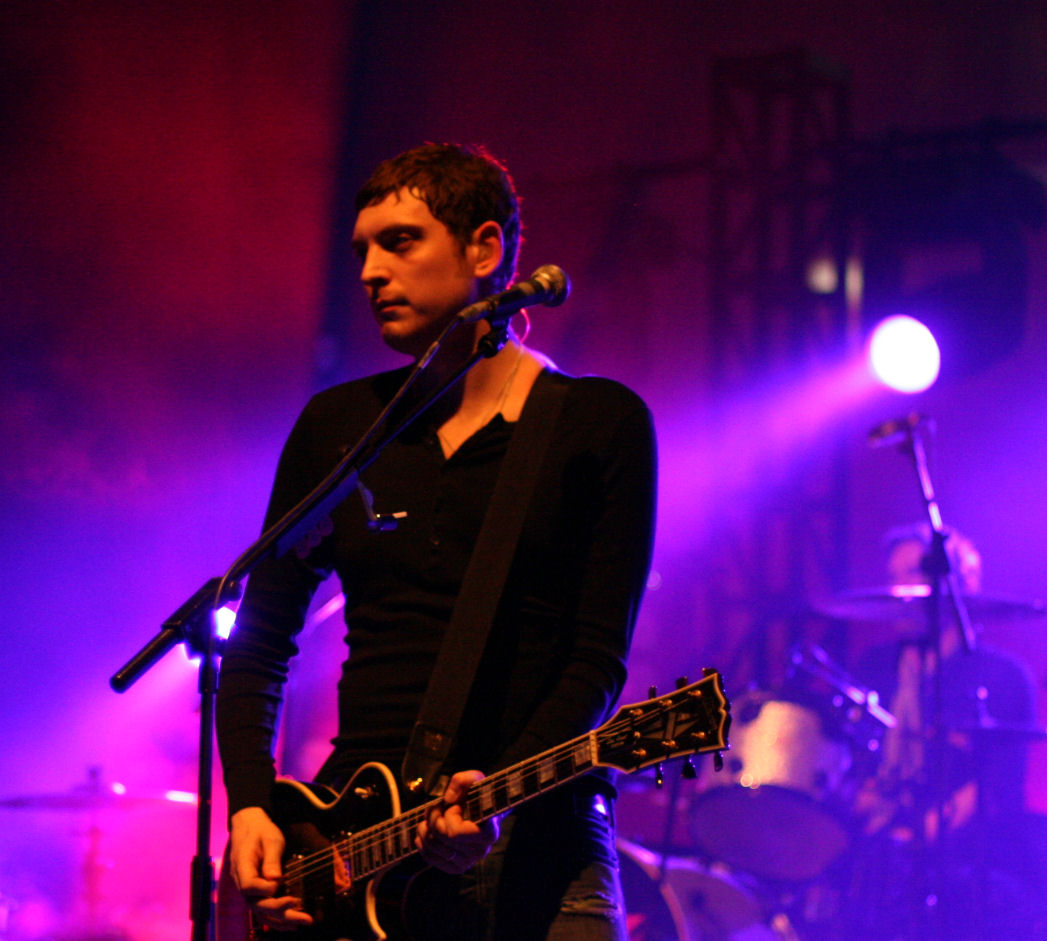
Nathan Connolly was asked to join the band in 2002.

Guitarist Nathan Connolly, previously a member of the band File Under Easy Listening, was working in an HMV store room in Belfast, and the band were introduced to him by a mutual friend. Connolly moved to Glasgow to join Snow Patrol in the spring of 2002.

During Lightbody and McClelland's years at the University of Dundee, they had been noticed by Richard Smernicki, a senior student, and his brother Paul. Richard Smernicki graduated in 1996, two years before Lightbody and McClelland, and become Polydor's Scottish A&R representative. Paul Smernicki became Polydor's Press and Artist Development Manager and Fiction's label manager. Jim Chancellor, an A&R executive for Fiction, and fellow talent scout Alex Close, approached Snow Patrol in Glasgow, listened to their demos, and judged them on "the quality of the songs", according to Lightbody. Chancellor introduced them to producer Jacknife Lee, who despite having been a guitarist in 1990s punk rock band Compulsion, had no rock production experience at that point, being known instead for his work with Basement Jaxx and Eminem.

Final Straw was released on 4 August 2003 under Black Lion, a subsidiary of Polydor Records. Its music was the same as on the band's first two albums, and no attempt was made to change the sound to something more radio-friendly. Final Straw came out in the US in 2004 and sold more than 250,000 copies. It became the 26th most popular album in the UK that year and was eventually certified five-times platinum. In 2005, on a tour to support the album, the band were an opening act for U2 on the Vertigo Tour in Europe. Snow Patrol played a short set in London that summer at the worldwide benefit concert Live 8. After a two-year tour of Final Straw, the band took time off and began writing and recording songs for a new album. Snow Patrol's version of John Lennon's "Isolation" was released on 10 December 2005 as part of the Amnesty International campaign Make Some Noise. The song was issued on the 2007 John Lennon tribute album, Instant Karma: The Amnesty International Campaign to Save Darfur.

=== Eyes Open and worldwide success (2005–2007) ===
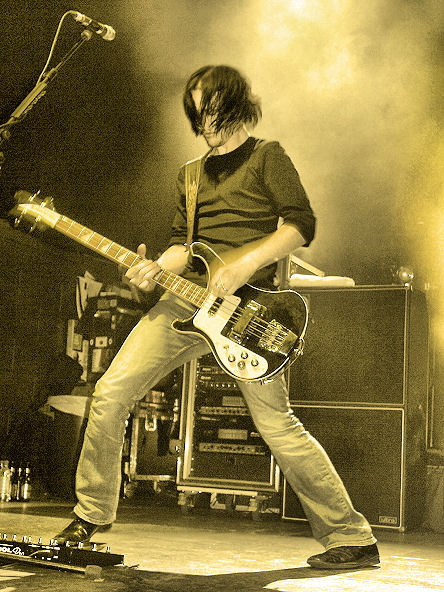
Paul Wilson (pictured) replaced bassist Mark McClelland in March 2005.

Bassist Mark McClelland left the band in March 2005. Lightbody said that "new and unexpected pressures" had "taken their toll on working relationships within the band", and it was felt that "the band could not move forward with Mark as a member". At the end of March 2005, former Terra Diablo member Paul Wilson was announced as replacement for McClelland. Snow Patrol also declared longtime touring keyboardist Tom Simpson an official member of the band.

Snow Patrol completed the recording of Eyes Open in December 2005, with Jacknife Lee returning as producer. The album was released on 28 April 2006 in Ireland and 1 May 2006 in the UK, with the first UK single, "You're All I Have", issued on 24 April 2006. The record was released in North America on 9 May. "Hands Open" was the first American single, but "Chasing Cars" reached the download and pop charts after it was heard during an emotional scene in the second-season finale of the American medical drama Grey's Anatomy on 15 May 2006. On 23 July 2006, "Chasing Cars" was the last song performed live on the BBC's Top of the Pops. The song peaked at number 6 on the UK Singles Chart and number 5 on the US Billboard Hot 100.

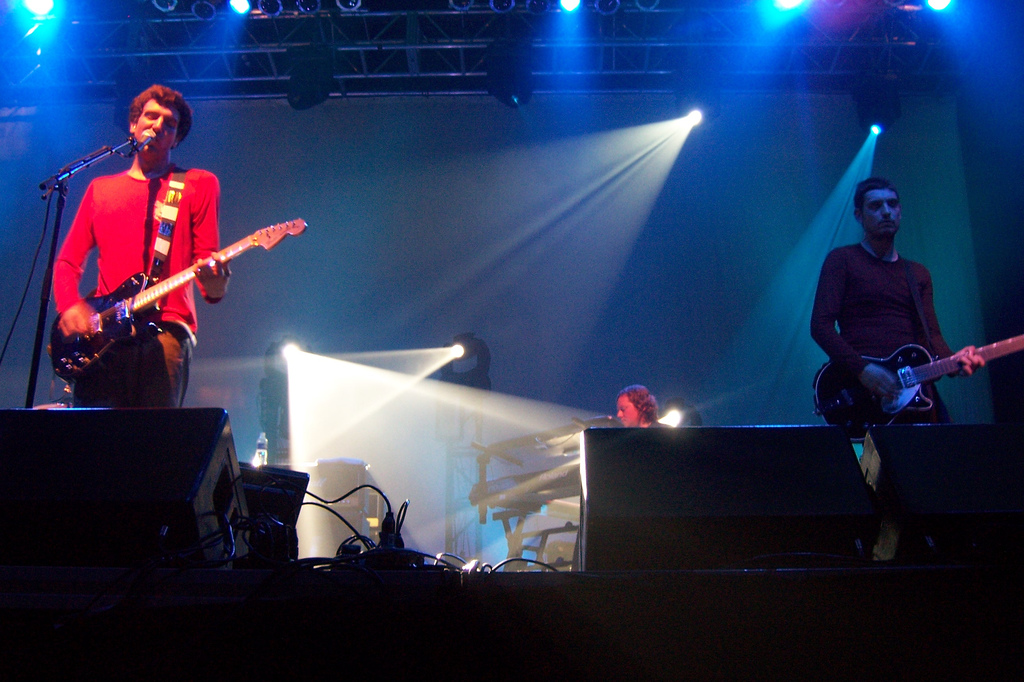
Snow Patrol on stage in New York's Roseland Ballroom in 2006

On 26 November 2006, Eyes Open became the best-selling album of 2006 in the UK after selling 1.5 million copies. It was also the 15th best-selling album of the 2000s and one of the best-selling albums in UK chart history.

At the 2007 Grammy Awards, "Chasing Cars" was nominated for Best Rock Song. At the 2007 Brit Awards, it was nominated for Best British Single. On 1 September 2007, Snow Patrol headlined a "homecoming" mini-festival in Lightbody and Jonny Quinn's home town of Bangor, County Down. Around 30,000 people came to see the band.

=== A Hundred Million Suns (2008–2009) ===
Recording for the follow-up album to Eyes Open began in late 2006, with Jacknife Lee returning a third time for production.

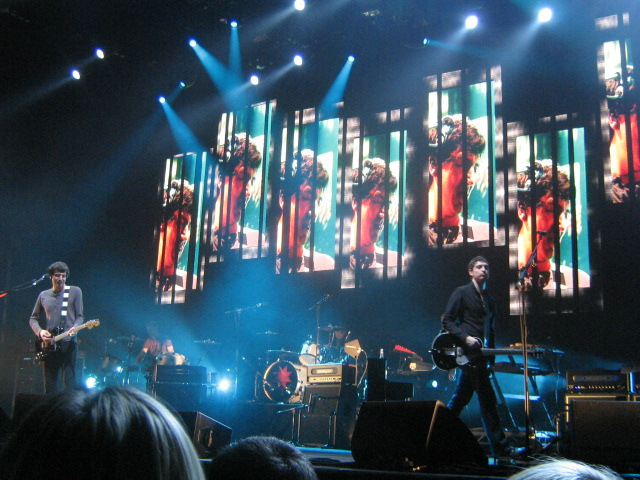
Snow Patrol performing at the Sheffield Arena in March 2009

The band launched their Taking Back the Cities Tour on 26 October 2008. Singer Miriam Kaufmann toured with the band and sang backing vocals, most notably on "Set the Fire to the Third Bar", which had originally featured Martha Wainwright. The UK & Ireland Arena Tour ended on 23 March 2009, and the final show was played at the Odyssey in Belfast to a 9,000-strong crowd that included family and friends and the Northern Irish football squad. It was reported that the band had played to an estimated 200,000 fans during the tour.

Snow Patrol visited South Africa to play dates at the Coca-Cola Zero Festival, supporting Oasis, before beginning a European leg of the tour. In June they supported Coldplay for a month on the Viva la Vida Tour.

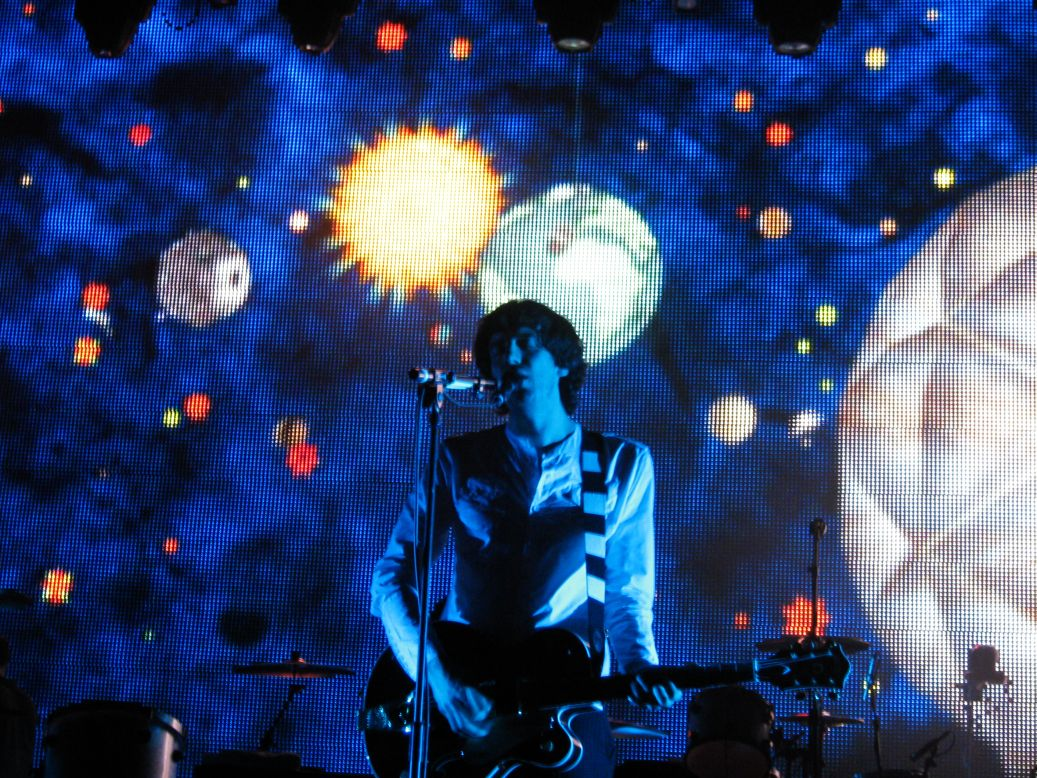
Lightbody performing "The Lightning Strike" in Frankfurt, May 2009

In November 2009, the band released a compilation album featuring tracks from their fifteen-year history, titled Up to Now. The album contained thirty tracks on two CDs, three of which were new songs. "Just Say Yes", a track written by Lightbody and earlier recorded by Pussycat Doll Nicole Scherzinger and X Factor star Diana Vickers, was released as the lead single on 2 November. The record also contained covers and rarities, including songs from the band's side project, The Reindeer Section. Snow Patrol spoke of making a tour documentary in the future, along the lines of U2's Rattle and Hum.

In December 2009, the PPL announced that "Chasing Cars" was the most-played song of the decade in the UK. In a UK poll conducted by Channel 4, it was voted the nation's favourite "song of the noughties". In January 2010, the band were nominated in three categories in the annual Meteor Awards. They played at the awards event on 19 February 2010, at the RDS.

=== Fallen Empires (2010–2012) ===
In 2009, Snow Patrol took a new musical direction and said they would enter their "next phase" with the release of their sixth album. Connolly advised fans to keep an open mind regarding the new material. On 12 January 2011, Lightbody launched a blog to give details about the progress of the band's next release.

Snow Patrol released the single "Called Out in the Dark" (remixed by Fatboy Slim) for radio airplay on 21 July 2011 on Zane Lowe's show on BBC Radio 1. Official sources said the single would be issued independently, and later as part of an EP. The UK release date was to be 4 September. More details on the EP were announced on 3 August, when the group's website revealed the artwork and track list contents. Along with the new single, the release contained three new tracks, titled "My Brothers", "I'm Ready", and "Fallen Empires". It was stated that the EP was intended to be a digital release limited to the UK and Ireland.

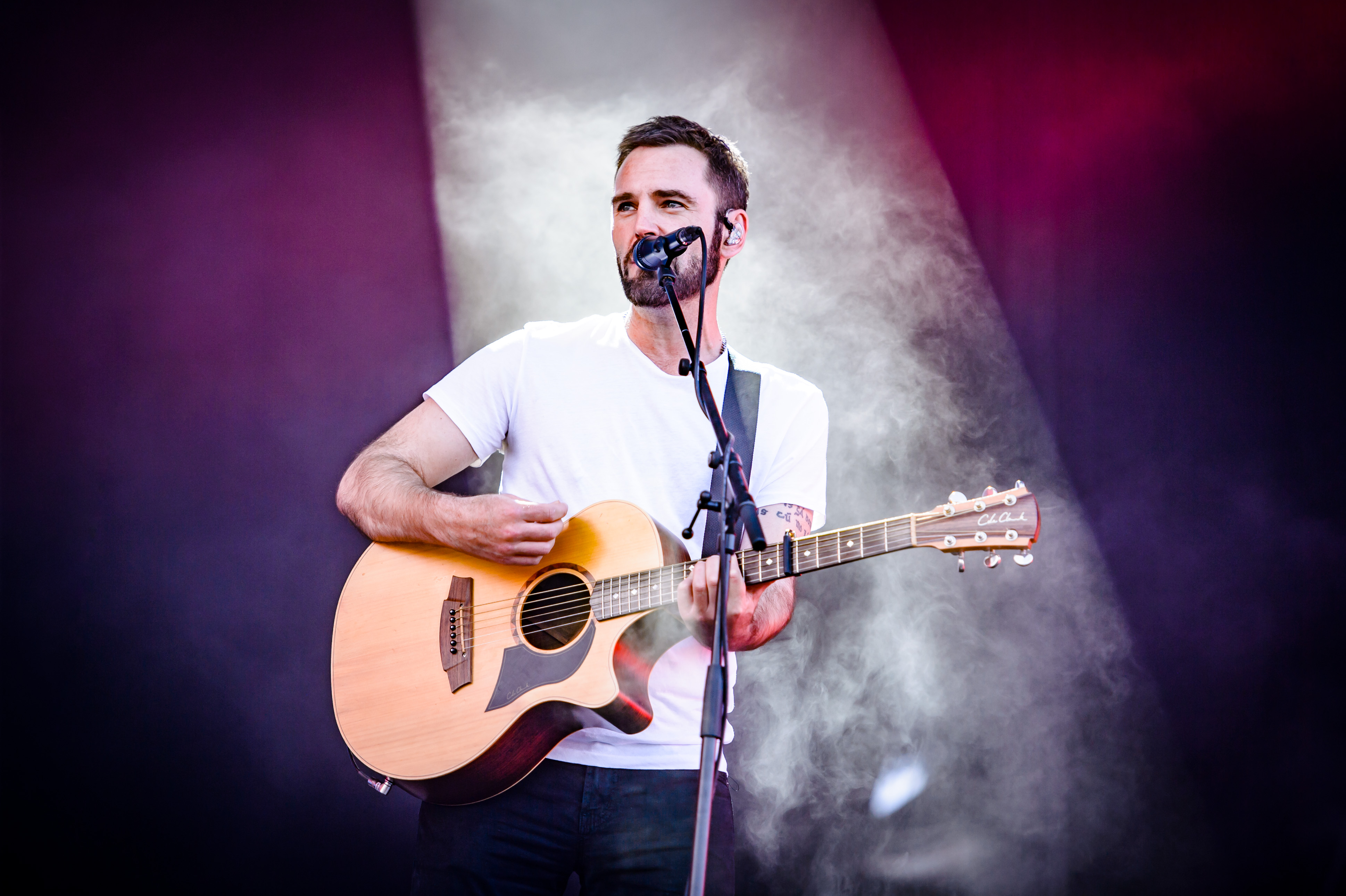
Johnny McDaid joined the group in 2011 after serving as a guest musician and songwriter in the studio.

After the premiere of the new lead single, the band's official website confirmed that the name of the new album would be Fallen Empires. Fallen Empires was released on 14 November 2011 in the UK and was launched at O2 Shepherd's Bush Empire. Singer-songwriter Johnny McDaid, who had worked on the album as a guest musician and songwriter, joined the band on the subsequent tour and eventually become a full member of Snow Patrol. The second single from Fallen Empires was "This Isn't Everything You Are", released on 13 November 2011.

=== Greatest Hits (2013–2018) ===
The band released a compilation album entitled Greatest Hits on 14 May 2013.

In August 2013, Snow Patrol headlined the Tennent's Vital festival and performed a warm-up show in London before the festival. After the show, they announced that keyboard player Tom Simpson would be leaving the band.

=== Wildness and Quinn and Wilson's departure (2018–2023) ===
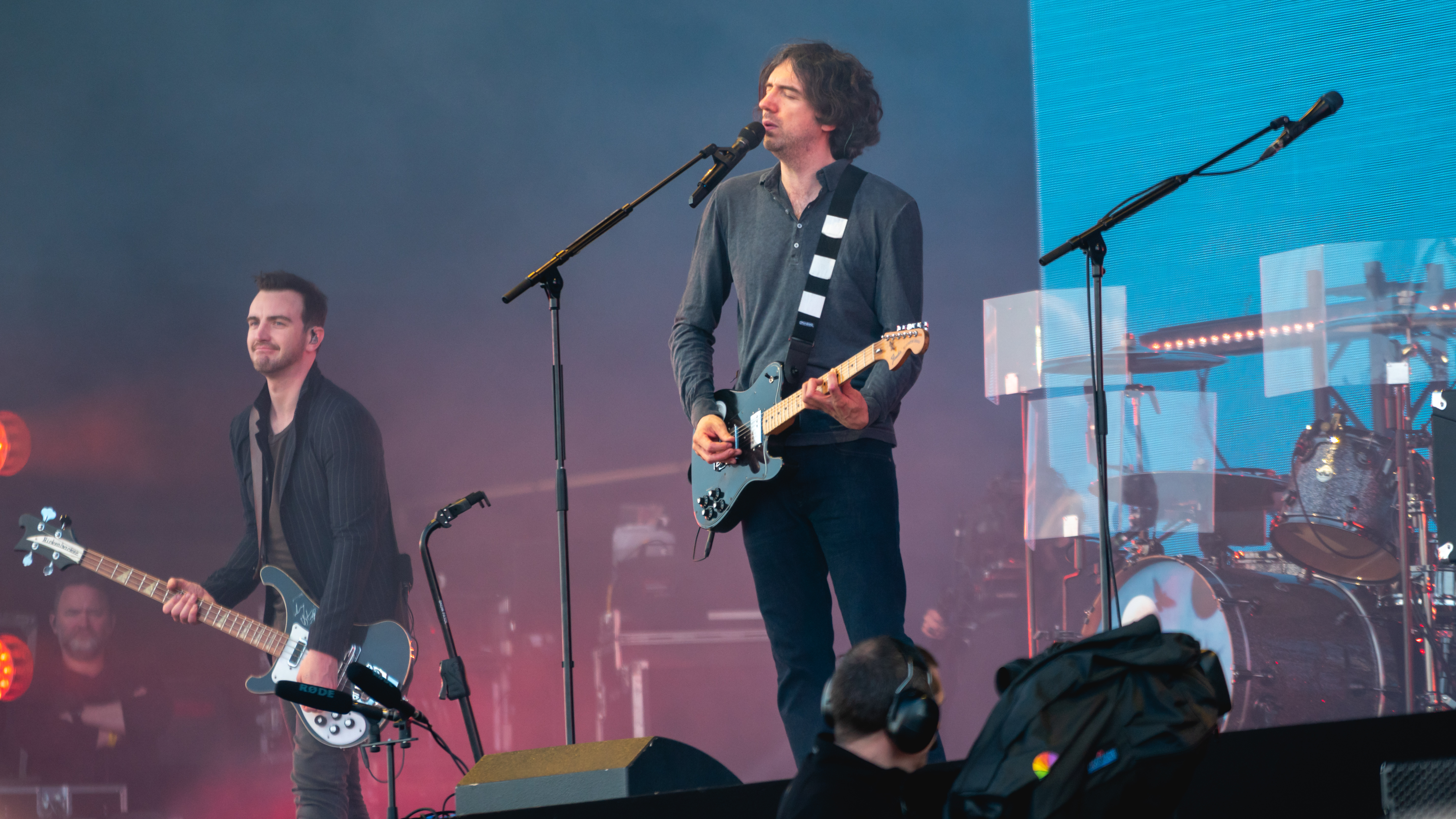
Wilson and Lightbody during a June 2019 performance at Werchter Boutique

The follow-up album to Fallen Empires was due for release in 2016, but Lightbody told NME that he had had to overcome writer's block, and that the songs written for the new album had been scrapped and replaced by new "mind-boggling" material. The band's seventh studio album, Wildness, was published on 25 May 2018.

In November 2018, the EP What If This Is All the Love You Ever Get? came out, featuring remixes of the track from Wildness. The band released their third compilation album, Reworked, on 8 November 2019, and followed it with a tour.

On 1 September 2023, Lightbody stated on the band's Instagram account that Quinn and Wilson had decided to leave the band. He announced a new album for some time in 2024 and said that Snow Patrol would continue as a trio of himself, Connolly, and McDaid. Wilson's decision to depart from Snow Patrol was said to have been due to his diminishing creative role and the feeling that his heart was no longer in the project.

=== The Forest Is the Path (2024–present) ===
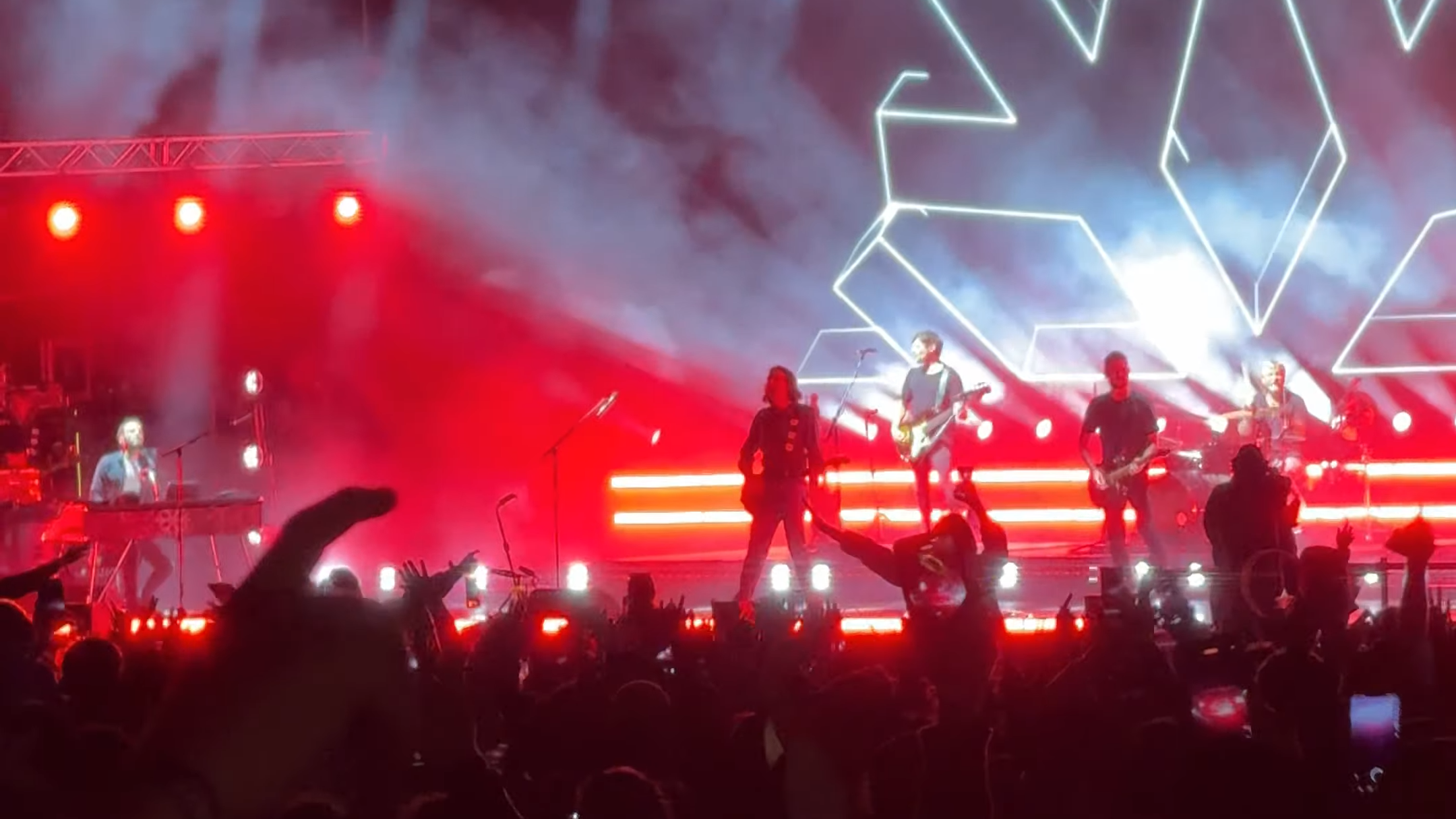
Snow Patrol performing in 2024. L–R:McDaid, Lightbody, touring bassist Ben Epstein, Connolly, and touring drummer Ash Soan.

On 29 May 2024, Snow Patrol unveiled "The Beginning", the first single from their Fraser T. Smith-produced album, The Forest Is the Path, which was released on 13 September.

== Contributions ==
In 2009, Snow Patrol curated the 22nd album in the Late Night Tales series of mix albums and covered the INXS song "New Sensation". Lightbody spoke of plans to release songs from the Listen... Tanks! project with Snow Patrol producer Jacknife Lee and Tired Pony, a country group. In 2014, the band contributed a new song, "I Won't Let You Go", to the soundtrack of the film Divergent.

== Appearances ==
On 30 July 2006, Snow Patrol appeared on the finale of the long-running weekly BBC music show Top of the Pops, performing "Chasing Cars". The band were the last act to appear on the show.

On 7 July 2007, they performed at the UK leg of Live Earth at Wembley Stadium, London. After their performance, Simpson was arrested at RAF Northolt for missing a court date in Glasgow, having been charged with possession of cocaine.

== Other ventures ==
Snow Patrol founded Polar Music, a publishing company run through Kobalt Music. The venture was independent from the band's publishing deal with Universal Music. Polar Music was planned to sign artists regardless of their genre, as drummer Jonny Quinn explained: "There is no agenda—if it's good enough and we believe in it 110%, we will sign it." Quinn and his fellow band members Connolly and Lightbody acted as A&R. The company's first signing was Johnny McDaid, previously of the Northern Irish band Vega4. Quinn said that they wished to sign artists to a one-album deal and did not want to put pressure on the artists with bigger, multi-year contracts. Polar Music had its initial chart hit in the first week of October 2009.

Gary Lightbody and Tom Simpson are both fans of the football club Dundee F.C. In 2008, they met the club's board of directors to find ways to help the struggling club financially. The band also owned a stake in the Houndstooth Pub in New York City.

=== Philanthropy ===
On 25 November 2007, Snow Patrol performed an acoustic session for the charity Mencap at Union Chapel, Islington. They were one of several bands to take part in the project, called "Little Noise Sessions", which was curated by Jo Whiley.

In 2009, Lightbody and Connolly donated plectrums and certificates to raise funds for the Music Beats Mines project, which aims to clear unexploded mines/landmines from conflict zones. The items were auctioned on eBay.

== Recognition ==
Other musicians, such as Ozzy Osbourne, Bono, Michael Stipe, and Nikki Sixx, have expressed admiration for Snow Patrol. Terri Hooley, founder of the Good Vibrations label and a lifelong supporter of local Northern Irish music, has expressed pride in bands like Snow Patrol.

== Awards and nominations ==
"Chasing Cars" was voted Song of the Decade on Channel 4's programme The Song of the Decade, which was broadcast on 28 December 2009. On 30 December 2009, Phonographic Performance Limited announced "Chasing Cars" was the most-played song of the decade in the UK. Ten years later in 2019, it was reportedly still the most played song of the 21st century in the UK.

In June 2010, the band were commemorated with a Heritage Award by PRS for Music. A plaque was erected on the Duke of York pub in Belfast, where Snow Patrol performed their first gig. The band were the sixth to receive the award, with all its members turning out. They later performed a live set to a small crowd of around thirty people.

== Band members ==
Current

- Gary Lightbody – lead vocals, guitar (1994–present), piano, keyboards (1994–2005)
- Nathan Connolly – guitar, backing vocals (2002–present)
- Johnny McDaid – piano, guitar, keyboards, programming, backing vocals (2011–present)

Session/touring

- Ben Epstein – bass, backing vocals (2024–present)
- Ash Soan – drums (2024–present)

== Discography ==
- Songs for Polarbears (1998)
- When It's All Over We Still Have to Clear Up (2001)
- Final Straw (2003)
- Eyes Open (2006)
- A Hundred Million Suns (2008)
- Fallen Empires (2011)
- Wildness (2018)
- The Forest Is the Path (2024)

== Tours ==
Tour	Supporting album(s)	Start date	End date
Final Straw Tour	Final Straw	10 August 2003	23 July 2005
Eyes Open Tour	Eyes Open	14 February 2006	22 September 2007
Taking Back the Cities Tour	A Hundred Million Suns	26 October 2008	20 October 2009
Reworked Tour	Up to Now	18 November 2009	12 December 2009
Fallen Empires Tour	Fallen Empires	20 January 2012	31 December 2012
Wildness Tour	Wildness	18 April 2019	4 September 2022
