= Live at Somerset House =

Video by Snow Patrol
- Released: 23 November 2004
- Recorded: 8 August 2004
- Genre: Alternative rock
- Length: 55:44
- Label: Fiction/Interscope
- Director: Dick Carruthers

Professional ratings
Review scores
| Source | Rating |
|---|---|
| Allmovie | (favorable) |
| NOW Magazine | (3/5) |
| PopMatters | (unfavorable) |
| The Irish Times | 3/5 stars |

Live at Somerset House (also known as Mums & Dads of the World Be Patient With Your Children) is a concert film by Northern Irish alternative rock band Snow Patrol. Recorded on 8 August 2004 at the Somerset House in London, England, United Kingdom, the video was released on 23 November 2004 on DVD.

The film features the songs "One Night Is Not Enough", "An Olive Grove Facing The Sea" and "Black & Blue" from their second album, When It's All Over We Still Have to Clear Up (2001), "You Are My Joy" (by The Reindeer Section, a side project spearheaded by Gary Lightbody), and the B-Side "Post Punk Progression". The remaining tracks are from the band's third album, Final Straw (2003).

Also released was another edition of the DVD with bonus features. Bonus features on the DVD are a Japanese tour diary, music videos, and a U.S. tour film.

== Track listing ==
1. "Wow" - 3:59
2. "Gleaming Auction" - 2:35
3. "Spitting Games" - 4:11
4. "One Night is Not Enough" - 4:14
5. "How to Be Dead" - 3:44
6. "You Are My Joy" - 4:00
7. "Chocolate" - 3:15
8. "An Olive Grove Facing the Sea" - 5:48
9. "Same" - 4:17
10. "Somewhere a Clock is Ticking" - 5:07
11. "Ways & Means" - 5:09
12. "Run" - 6:47
13. "Black & Blue" - 5:12
14. "Post Punk Progression" - 5:21
15. "Tiny Little Fractures" - 2:48

=== Bonus features ===
1. "Japanese Tour Diary" - 13:01
2. "4 Play 'Home'" - 10:00
3. "Run" (Video) - 4:26
4. "Spitting Games" (US Video) - 3:47
5. "Chocolate" (Video) - 4:09
6. "Teenage Kicks" (Live in Japan) - 4:00
7. "US Tour Footage" - 6:58

== Personnel ==
- Gary Lightbody - vocals, guitar
- Nathan Connolly - guitar, backing vocals
- Mark McClelland - bass guitar
- Jonny Quinn - drums
- Tom Simpson - keyboards
