= Up to Now =

Compilation album by Snow Patrol
- Released: 6 November 2009
- Recorded: 1998–2009
- Length: 120:20
- Label: Fiction
- Producers: Miti Adhikari; Michael Brennan Jnr; Tony Doogan; Jacknife Lee; Gary Lightbody; Mark McClelland; Snow Patrol; Jamie Watson

Snow Patrol chronology
Late Night Tales: Snow Patrol (2009)	Up to Now (2009)	Fallen Empires (2011)

Singles from Up to Now
- 1. "Just Say Yes" Released: 23 October 2009; 2. "An Olive Grove Facing the Sea (2009 Version)" Released: 4 December 2009

Up to Now is the first compilation album by Northern Irish alternative rock band Snow Patrol. The album features tracks spanning Snow Patrol's fifteen-year music career, including tracks from The Reindeer Section, a side-project/supergroup involving musicians from all over Scotland. The album was released in early November 2009, primarily as a two-disc set and a three-disc digipak format containing one DVD of bonus material. A limited edition heavyweight box was also sold. Three new songs were released on the album. One of these was "Just Say Yes", the lead single taken from the compilation. The solo re-recording of "An Olive Grove Facing the Sea" was released as the album's second single. In the Netherlands, Belgium, and Finland, "Run" was re-released in a version called "Run (2010 Version)" in January 2010.

The release has been described by the band as a collection of the band's best loved songs, and not a greatest hits, as the album also contains non-singles. It was received favourably by music critics for not being a typical hits record. The album performed well commercially, reaching the top 5 in three countries and the top 40 in another. It also sold well on the iTunes Store, making the top 10 selling albums lists in various countries.

== Background ==
The album marks the band's 15 year music career. It is a reminder to newer fans that the band had made two albums before Final Straw, before achieving any commercial success. In line with the 15 years they have been recording, the album features 2 CDs with 15 songs on each, with 3 brand new tracks. The band felt it was a good time for such a release as their newer material was heading towards new, unexplored musical styles.

To come up with a track list for the album, each member compiled one individually, initially coming up with almost the same song selections. According to guitarist Nathan Connolly, the only differences in opinion on song selections among the band members arose on songs from the earliest albums. Forty songs were initially selected, but they realized it would not be practically possible to include all of them. They were whittled down to thirty, some reluctantly. One of these was "Make This Go on Forever". Vocalist Gary Lightbody explained that they did it as to evenly represent all their albums. The final chosen songs are from all five studio albums, past b-sides and rarities, apart from three new recordings. They also felt the song selection should draw all sorts of fans; those who've supported from the start and those who might be hearing about the band for the first time, which was the reason for comparatively less representation of songs from the early albums. Commenting on fans' arguments about leaving singles "How to Be Dead" and "One Night is Not Enough" off the album, Lightbody said that they could not please everyone. Drummer Jonny Quinn remembers enjoying the selection process as he went back to listen their older songs he had not heard recently.

"Calling it a greatest hits album would be a bit grandiose."

— Gary Lightbody

Lightbody has made it clear that the album is not a greatest hits record, and has expressed his dislike for such. According to him, the compilation is a way to leave the last 15 years behind, and looking forward to 15 years in the future. The album's title, Up to Now was specifically chosen to indicate the band has more to offer in the future, and that it was not a way of saying goodbye. The band believes that the album signifies a portrait of the band, who they are, "warts and all". Lightbody said it represents the band making a statement, explaining: "We've climbed a hill and now we're looking back and taking in the view for a bit. It's nice to show people that we didn't just arrive overnight". The artwork for the album was revealed on 25 September 2009.

== Promotion ==
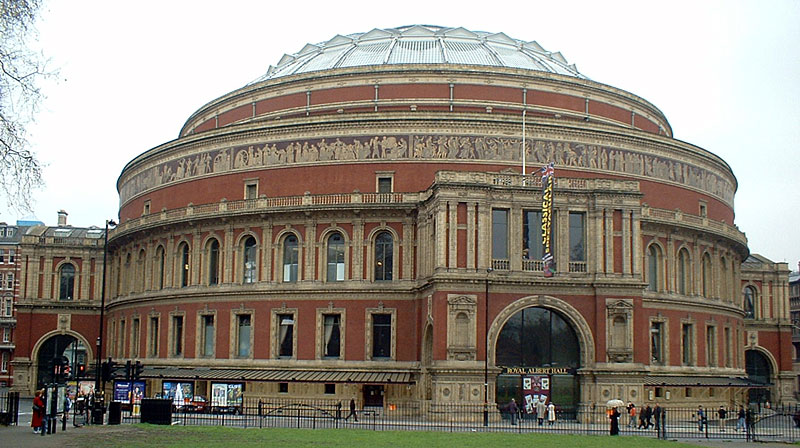
The Pub Quiz winners saw a Snow Patrol concert at London's Royal Albert Hall

To promote the album, a competition exclusive for members on the Snow Patrol mailing list was held. Fans wishing to enter the competition had to sign up and answer a question. The competition closed on 9 October 2009 and its winner received a drum skin, signed by all members of the band, as well as a photograph proving its authenticity, taken on the band's North American Tour of September–October 2009. On 16 October 2009, a competition called the "Up to Now Pub Quiz" was launched on Facebook. Fans were required to create teams of five, and were posed with ten questions each week, related to the band's entire career. The team with the most correct answers at the end flew to London to see a Snow Patrol concert at the Royal Albert Hall, with a certain part of travel cost paid. The team was allotted their own private box at the venue, and got to meet the band afterward. Along the same lines, a Swiss radio station 20 Minuten hosted a similar competition for listeners. They had a pair of tickets for the concert for the Royal Albert Hall concert of 24 November to give away. All flight and hotel accommodation costs were paid for by the radio station. The band also played an intimate, acoustic show at King's Head in Crouch End, London on 4 November. Tickets for this show could only be obtained via two competitions, one organized on Play.com and the other on the band's official website. Both involved answering a simple question. On 8 November 2009, the band released a second application for the iPhone. An online application was also made, where users could manually create their own snowflakes.

=== Singles ===
The lead single taken from the album was the new recording "Just Say Yes", released first in the United States on 23 October 2009 via Amazon.com and iTunes. It was physically released on CD on 30 October and 2 November in Ireland and the United Kingdom respectively. The single was a hit in the Netherlands, topping the Top 40 chart. The second single, "An Olive Grove Facing the Sea" (2009 Version) was only released digitally on iTunes on 4 December 2009. It was also given away as a freebie for a day on the 1st day (26 December 2009) of iTunes' 12 Days of Christmas. In Belgium and The Netherlands the song "Run" was released on 25 January 2010 as the 2nd single of Up to Now. In The Netherlands the song was Alarmschijf on Radio538 in week 6 of 2010. The song entered the Dutch Top 40 on 26 February 2010 and moved up to the number one position on that chart. That makes it the 5th Snow Patrol song that hit on that chart, and the first number one hit in The Netherlands. In Belgium, Wallonia, the song was on the Top 30 of the Ultratop 50, but in Flanders, Just say Yes peaked at number 6 in the Ultratop 50.

== Release ==
The album was made available in three formats:

- Standard – Two CDs featuring thirty tracks.
- Digipak – Two CDs, and a DVD containing documentaries and live footage.
- Box set – Limited edition heavyweight box, numbered and wrapped in cloth. Contains three CDs, three heavyweight LPs, two DVDs, a lithograph print by Bradley Quinn and an LP sized booklet.

The additional DVD in the digipak format contains the animated film for "The Lightning Strike" and previously unseen live footage. The box-set went on pre-order on 11 September 2009 and was priced at £49.99. The first 100 sold boxes were individually numbered and signed by all band members. The DVDs have no region restrictions, and can be played in any part of the world. The album contained three new songs: "Just Say Yes", "Give Me Strength" and "Dark Roman Wine". Additionally, a solo rendition of "An Olive Grove Facing the Sea", performed by Gary Lightbody was also released through the album. Also featured is the cover of Beyoncé Knowles' "Crazy in Love", which became a hit in the hip hop community. Lightbody felt it would be one of the most sought-after songs on the collection.

"This song is about the guys in the band. Ten of our 15 years were shit. They were fun, but we didn't sell any records, so this is me saying thank you. Soppy, isn't it?"

— Gary Lightbody, on "Give Me Strength"

Lightbody is pleased with "Give Me Strength" and has named it [probably] his most favorite song by the band. The song is about everyone who's "been there", his love for his bandmates, especially Jonny Quinn, whom he considers his big brother. He has said that it was "long overdue". The song is lyrically similar to "Weather to Fly" by Elbow. Lightbody is a huge fan of the band and is "head-over-heels in love" with them. He has credited the band for being the reason for "most of the things [he does]" and does not deny that he may have subconsciously based "Give Me Strength" on "Weather to Fly".

== Reception ==
Professional ratings
Review scores
Source	Rating
AllMusic	3/5 stars
The Border Mail	4/5
Drowned in Sound	6/10
IndieLondon	4.5/5
The List	2/5 stars
Pitchfork	5.1/10
PopMatters	7/10
Rolling Stone	3/5 stars
Stuff.co.nz	4/5 stars
Sunday Mercury	Favourable

Critical reception towards Up to Now was "generally favorable" according to the review collecting site Metacritic, where it holds a score of 62. IndieLondon's Jack Foley gave it a 4.5/5 rating, and found it "classy". He praised it for not being a generic compilation album, noting the inclusion of the band's lesser known songs. He praised the band's willingness to tread unfamiliar territory (with "Just Say Yes") and found the synth a "nice touch". Rolling Stone reviewer Jon Dolan found the set "claustrophobic" and awarded it three stars out of five. AllMusic's Andrew Leahey gave the album a positive review, and also gave it three stars. He felt it indicated the band's growth over the years. He found the new song "Give Me Strength" as one of the best songs the band has written in years. The Border Mail gave it 4 out of 5 and found the set "expansive". Drowned in Sound called "An Olive Grove Facing the Sea" a classic and named it the song to be played to Snow Patrol detractors. Stuff.co.nz gave it 4 stars out of 5. Reviewer Kris Hall said that the album looked like a "shameless cash grab" at the first look, but turns out to be different. He noted that the diverse material meant that there was something for everyone. He also said wrote the live renditions of "Run" and "Chasing Cars" were not to be missed. However, Scottish magazine The List in a negative review said that it was still a typical greatest hits album. In Pitchfork's mixed review, Tom Breihan wrote that the album was too long and "overstuffed". The inclusion of "Crazy in Love" was praised in most reviews, and was seen as an indication of the band's lighter, fun side. However, in Pitchfork's review, it was called "limp" and "unfunny". Hot Press' Peter Murphy wrote he would have liked to see the duet "Some Surprise" included.

On national record charts, it peaked at number 5 in the Netherlands and Ireland. In the UK, it peaked at 3. It also reached the top 40 in Switzerland, peaking at number 36.

== Supporting tour ==
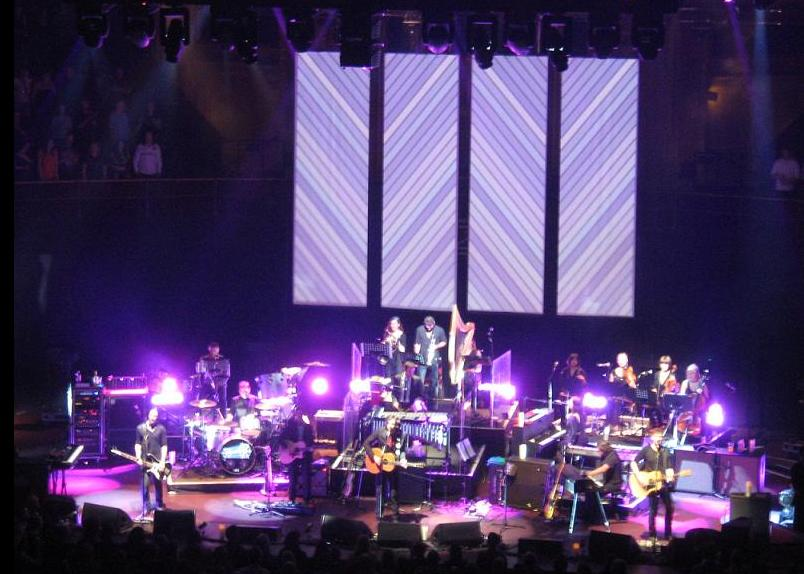
Snow Patrol at the Royal Albert Hall on 24 November 2009

The band "looked back" by playing a special tour, called the Reworked Tour. It saw the band play "reworked" versions of songs that spanned their full career, including songs from side-project The Reindeer Section. The songs were reconstructed using strings, brass and choir. The band visited a south London studio to rehearse the reworked songs. Touring began in mid-November, and continued till early December. The band played without any support act. They took the stage twice between an interval, accompanied by 11 special musical guests, including Iain Archer, members of Belle & Sebastian, Teenage Fanclub and Idlewild.

== Track listing ==
Disc 1
No.	Title	Lyrics	Music	Production	Length
1.	"Chocolate" (originally from Final Straw)	Gary Lightbody	Nathan Connolly; Lightbody; Mark McClelland; Jonny Quinn	Jacknife Lee	3:02
2.	"Chasing Cars" (originally from Eyes Open)	Lightbody	Connolly; Lightbody; Tom Simpson; Quinn; Paul Wilson	Lee	4:27
3.	"Crack the Shutters" (originally from A Hundred Million Suns)	Lightbody	Connolly; Lightbody; Simpson; Quinn; Wilson	Lee	3:22
4.	"Set the Fire to the Third Bar" (featuring Martha Wainwright; originally from Eyes Open)	Lightbody	Connolly; Lightbody; Simpson; Quinn; Wilson	Lee	3:24
5.	"Crazy in Love"	Beyoncé Knowles; Rich Harrison; Shawn Carter; Eugene Record	Knowles; Harrison; Carter; Record	Miti Adhikari	4:25
6.	"Just Say Yes"	Lightbody; Lee	Lightbody; Lee	Lee	4:42
7.	"Batten Down the Hatch" (originally from When It's All Over We Still Have to Clear Up)	Lightbody; McClelland; Quinn	Lightbody; McClelland; Quinn	McClelland; Lightbody; Tony Doogan; Michael Brennan Jnr	3:29
8.	"You're All I Have" (originally from Eyes Open)	Lightbody	Connolly; Lightbody; Simpson; Quinn; Wilson	Lee	4:33
9.	"Hands Open" (originally from Eyes Open)	Lightbody	Connolly; Lightbody; Simpson; Quinn; Wilson	Lee	3:17
10.	"Cartwheels" (originally from Son of Evil Reindeer)	Lightbody	Lightbody; The Reindeer Section	Doogan; Lightbody	4:09
11.	"The Planets Bend Between Us" (originally from A Hundred Million Suns)	Lightbody	Connolly; Lightbody; Simpson; Quinn; Wilson	Lee	4:03
12.	"Ask Me How I Am" (originally from When It's All Over We Still Have to Clear Up)	Lightbody; McClelland; Quinn	Lightbody; McClelland; Quinn	McClelland; Lightbody; Doogan; Brennan Jnr	2:36
13.	"On/Off" (originally from When It's All Over We Still Have to Clear Up)	Lightbody; McClelland; Quinn	Lightbody; McClelland; Quinn	McClelland; Lightbody; Doogan; Brennan Jnr	2:41
14.	"Making Enemies" (originally from When It's All Over We Still Have to Clear Up)	Lightbody; McClelland; Quinn	Lightbody; McClelland; Quinn	McClelland; Lightbody; Doogan; Brennan Jnr	4:21
15.	"Run" (Mencap Little Noise Sessions, live at the Union Chapel; original version from Final Straw)	Lightbody	Connolly; Lightbody; McClelland; Quinn; Iain Archer		5:04

Disc 2
No.	Title	Lyrics	Music	Production	Length
1.	"Take Back the City" (originally from A Hundred Million Suns)	Lightbody	Connolly; Lightbody; Simpson; Quinn; Wilson	Lee	4:42
2.	"Shut Your Eyes" (originally from Eyes Open)	Lightbody	Connolly; Lightbody; Simpson; Quinn; Wilson	Lee	3:17
3.	"An Olive Grove Facing the Sea" (2009 version; original version from When It's All Over We Still Have to Clear Up)	Lightbody	Lightbody; McClelland; Quinn	Lee	4:59
4.	"Run" (originally from Final Straw)	Lightbody	Connolly; Lightbody; McClelland; Quinn; Archer	Lee	5:57
5.	"Give Me Strength"	Lightbody	Lightbody	Lee	3:24
6.	"Signal Fire" (originally from the Spider-Man 3 soundtrack)	Lightbody	Connolly; Lightbody; Simpson; Quinn; Wilson	Lee	4:27
7.	"Spitting Games" (originally from Final Straw)	Lightbody	Connolly; Lightbody; McClelland; Quinn	Lee	3:48
8.	"Open Your Eyes" (originally from Eyes Open)	Lightbody	Connolly; Lightbody; Simpson; Quinn; Wilson	Lee	5:40
9.	"Dark Roman Wine"	Lightbody	Lightbody	Lee	4:17
10.	"Fifteen Minutes Old" (originally from Songs for Polarbears)	Lightbody; McClelland; Quinn	Lightbody; McClelland; Quinn	Jamie Watson	3:09
11.	"You Are My Joy" (originally from Son of Evil Reindeer)	Lightbody	Lightbody; The Reindeer Section	Doogan; Lightbody	3:46
12.	"The Golden Floor" (originally from A Hundred Million Suns)	Lightbody	Connolly; Lightbody; Simpson; Quinn; Wilson	Lee	3:19
13.	"Starfighter Pilot" (originally from Songs for Polarbears)	Lightbody	Lightbody	Watson	3:20
14.	"PPP" (originally from the "Run" single)	Lee James Potter	Potter	Snow Patrol	3:24
15.	"Chasing Cars" (Mencap Little Noise Sessions, live at the Union Chapel; original version from Eyes Open)	Lightbody	Connolly; Lightbody; Simpson; Quinn; Wilson		5:16

DVD
No.	Title	Length
1.	"Up to Now Documentary"	44:20
2.	"Take Back the Cities Documentary"	21:09
3.	"The Lightning Strike" (animated film)	16:17
4.	"Set the Fire to the Third Bar" (featuring Martha Wainwright; live from Abbey Road)	4:40
5.	"If There's a Rocket Tie Me to It" (live at V Festival, Chelmsford, UK, August 2009)	4:25
6.	"Chocolate" (live at Eden Project, UK, August 2006)	3:06
7.	"Hands Open" (live at V Festival, Chelmsford, UK, August 2009)	4:06
8.	"Run" (live at Eden Project, UK, August 2006)	5:24
9.	"Somewhere a Clock Is Ticking" (live at V Festival, Chelmsford, UK, August 2009)	4:24
10.	"Shut Your Eyes" (live at V Festival, Chelmsford, UK, August 2009)	9:08
11.	"Chasing Cars" (live at Isle of Wight Festival, UK, June 2007)	4:54
12.	"Crack the Shutters" (live at V Festival, Chelmsford, UK, August 2009)	3:24
13.	"Take Back the City" (live at V Festival, Chelmsford, UK, August 2009)	4:52
14.	"Open Your Eyes" (live at Pinkpop, Netherlands, July 2009)	5:54
15.	"The Lightning Strike" (live at Pinkpop, Netherlands, July 2009)	17:07
16.	"You're All I Have" (live at Pinkpop, Netherlands, July 2009)	5:12

=== Box set ===
Including the two CDs and DVD, the box set version contains an additional CD and DVD.

All lyrics are written by Lightbody, except for track 6 (Wilde/Shelley) and track 7 (Dennis/Gottwald) on disc III.

Disc III (Mencap Little Noise Sessions, Live at the Union Chapel)
No.	Title	Music	Length
1.	"You're All I Have"	Connolly/Lightbody/Simpson/Wilson/Quinn	7:31
2.	"How to Be Dead"	Connolly/Lightbody/McClelland/Quinn	5:22
3.	"Grazed Knees"	Connolly/Lightbody/McClelland/Quinn	3:56
4.	"You Could Be Happy"	Connolly/Lightbody/Simpson/Wilson/Quinn	6:06
5.	"On/Off"	Lightbody/McClelland/Quinn	4:24
6.	"I Am an Astronaut"	Ricky Wilde/Peter Shelley	3:22
7.	"About You Now"	Cathy Dennis/Lukasz Gottwald	4:29
8.	"Chocolate"	Connolly/Lightbody/McClelland/Quinn	4:03
9.	"Chasing Cars"	Connolly/Lightbody/Simpson/Wilson/Quinn	8:37
10.	"Run"	Archer/Connolly/Lightbody/McClelland/Quinn	5:06

DVD (Videos)
No.	Title	Length
1.	"Starfighter Pilot"	3:28
2.	"Ask Me How I Am"	2:47
3.	"Spitting Games"	3:47
4.	"Run"	4:26
5.	"Chocolate"	4:09
6.	"How to Be Dead"	3:11
7.	"You're All I Have"	4:00
8.	"Chasing Cars"	4:27
9.	"Chasing Cars" (Nick Brandt version)	3:40
10.	"Set the Fire to the Third Bar" (featuring Martha Wainwright)	3:23
11.	"Open Your Eyes"	5:41
12.	"Shut Your Eyes"	3:17
13.	"Signal Fire"	4:34
14.	"Take Back the City"	4:16
15.	"Crack the Shutters"	3:20
16.	"If There's a Rocket Tie Me to It"	3:37
17.	"The Planets Bend Between Us"	4:00
18.	"Just Say Yes"	4:11

== Charts and certifications ==
=== Weekly charts ===
Weekly chart performance for Up to Now
Chart (2009–2011)	Peak position
Australian Albums Chart	54
Austrian Albums (Ö3 Austria)	62
Belgian Albums (Ultratop Flanders)	8
Belgian Albums (Ultratop Wallonia)	28
Danish Albums (Hitlisten)	2
Dutch Albums (Album Top 100)	5
European Albums Chart	10
French Albums (SNEP)	85
German Albums (Offizielle Top 100)	38
Greek Albums (IFPI)	38
Irish Albums Chart	5
Mexican Albums (Top 100 Mexico)	79
Norwegian Albums (VG-lista)	5
Portuguese Albums (AFP)	22
Scottish Albums (Official Charts)	3
Swiss Albums (Schweizer Hitparade)	36
UK Albums (Official Charts)	3
US Billboard 200	182

=== Year-end charts ===
2009 year-end chart performance for Up to Now
Chart (2009)	Position
Dutch Albums (Album Top 100)	51
UK Albums (OCC)	14

2010 year-end chart performance for Up to Now
Chart (2010)	Position
Belgian Albums (Ultratop Flanders)	12
Dutch Albums (Album Top 100)	15
UK Albums (OCC)	67

2011 year-end chart performance for Up to Now
Chart (2011)	Position
UK Albums (OCC)	114

2012 year-end chart performance for Up to Now
Chart (2012)	Position
UK Albums (OCC)	135

== Certifications ==
Certifications for Up to Now
Region	Certification	Certified units/sales
Austria (IFPI Austria)	Gold	10,000^{*}
Belgium (BRMA)	Platinum	30,000^{*}
Denmark (IFPI Danmark)	Platinum	20,000^{‡}
Germany (BVMI)	Gold	100,000^{‡}
Ireland (IRMA)	2× Platinum	30,000^{^}
Netherlands (NVPI)	Platinum	60,000
United Kingdom (BPI)	4× Platinum	1,200,000^{‡}
Summaries
Europe (IFPI)	Platinum	1,000,000^{*}
^{*} Sales figures based on certification alone.^{^} Shipments figures based on certification alone.^{‡} Sales+streaming figures based on certification alone.

== Release history ==
Release history and formats for Up to Now
Country	Date	Edition	Label
Australia	6 November 2009	Standard edition	Universal Music Group
United Kingdom	9 November 2009	Standard edition	Fiction Records
United Kingdom	9 November 2009	Deluxe edition	Fiction Records
Canada	10 November 2009	Standard edition	Universal Music Group
United States	10 November 2009	Standard edition	Geffen Records
Japan	11 November 2009	Standard edition	Universal Music Group
Germany	20 November 2009	Standard edition	Polydor Records
Germany	20 November 2009	Deluxe edition	Polydor Records
