= Little Doses =

Scottish alternative rock band

- Origin: Edinburgh, Scotland
- Genres: Alternative rock, indie rock
- Years active: 2006–present
- Labels: Black Ditto Recordings
- Members: Kirsten Ross; Mark McClelland; Michael Branagh; Mike Skinner; Chris Alderson
- Past members: Paul Mellon; Laurence Lean; Richard Beeby
- Website: littledoses.com

Little Doses are a Scottish alternative rock band from Edinburgh, Scotland, who were formed in 2006. The band comprises lead vocalist Kirsten Ross, Mark McClelland on bass guitar, Michael Branagh on drums and backing vocals, Chris Alderson and Mike Skinner on guitar. They released their debut album, Rock Riot Soul on McClelland's Black Ditto Recordings label in March 2012.

== History and formation ==
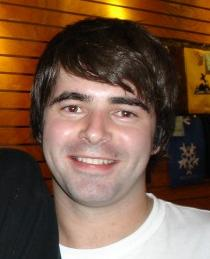
Mark McClelland, founder.

Mark McClelland was one of the founding members of Snow Patrol, along with Gary Lightbody, in 1994. They joined with drummer Michael Morrison in 1994 at the University of Dundee, where they were studying. The trio formed the band Shrug, which would be the earliest incarnation of Snow Patrol. Morrison left Shrug in 1996. In 1997, the band changed their name to Polarbear. They band released their first EP under this name the same year under Electric Honey. However, they changed their name after discovering ex-Jane's Addiction bassist Eric Avery already had a side-project of the same name. The band then recruited drummer Jonny Quinn and Snow Patrol was born.

Snow Patrol were signed to the then-fledgling Jeepster label, home to Belle & Sebastian. They became only the second act to be signed by Jeepster. The band recorded two studio albums under Jeepster - Songs for Polarbears and When It's All Over We Still Have to Clear Up. The albums were not commercially successful at the time, and the label ultimately terminated their contract.

In 2003, the band signed to Fiction/Interscope, and released their third album Final Straw. The album was a commercial success, boosted by the single "Run", which reached No. 5 on the UK Singles Chart. The band toured heavily for Final Straw. As touring neared its end, McClelland left the band. An official statement concerning the leaving read:

Snow Patrol have parted company with bass player Mark McClelland. Following a life-changing year in 2004, Snow Patrol found themselves under a whole set of new and unexpected pressures. These pressures have unfortunately taken their toll on working relationships within the band, and it was felt that Snow Patrol could not move forward with Mark as a member.

Following the split, McClelland turned to writing music. McClelland had known drummer Michael Branagh for a few years. They had first met at the Colombia Hotel after a Degrassi gig. When Degrassi went on a hiatus, McClelland gave him a call. He set up an audition via the internet, and as a result, guitarist Paul Mellon, former F.O. Machete guitarist joined the duo. Along with McClelland's girlfriend (now wife) Kirsten Ross on vocals, Little Doses was formed.

== The band ==
The acts Little Doses have cited as influences are - Sparklehorse, Super Furry Animals, Grant Lee Buffalo, Red House Painters, Pavement, Blondie, Pete Yorn, Coldplay, Harry and the Potters, Stevie Wonder, Dawn of the Replicants, The Secret Machines, Deus, Jeff Buckley, Nick Drake, Pixies, David Bowie, The Afghan Whigs and The Twilight Singers.

To date, the band has seen three guitarists. The original guitarist Paul Mellon left the band to join Red Light Company and then returned to his previous band F.O. Machete. The second guitarist, Laurence Lean returned to his original band Annie Christian. The third guitarist, Richard Beeby, who joined in March 2008 left in May 2009 to a reincarnation of his former band, now called Death Trap City. The band's appearance at the Leith Festival saw the band first playing as a quintet, as part of an experiment. The experiment worked and new guitarists Chris Alderson, formally of Edinburgh's Kays Lavelle and Mike Skinner, formerly of Edinburgh's Green Orange (with singer/songwriter Jason Pillay) and The Jazz Incident joined the band.

The new members were immediately thrown into the recording of the debut album, recorded in a homestudio in McClelland's Musselburgh flat. Rock Riot Soul is due to be released on fledgling self run label Black Ditto Recordings on 5 March 2012.

== Activity ==
Little Doses have been playing small gigs and have made appearances to a number of music festivals, such as the Wickerman Festival, T on the Fringe and T break. They have also recorded two demos. The first demo, Chamber Studio Session, was recorded in 2007 at the Chamber Studios under Jamie Watson, returning to the same Edinburgh studio and engineer that recorded Snow Patrol's first album. The other demo The Chemical Session, was recorded in 2007 at Chem19 Studios under producer Andy Miller. The band made the demos available for free download.

In March 2012, Little Doses release their self-recorded, self-produced and self-released debut album, Rock Riot Soul backed by a string of dates in Scotland and Northern Ireland.

== Reviews ==
Initial response to Little Doses has been positive. They have been well received and have received positive reviews for their shows and sound. The Daily Record called the "bass lines (are) fat and distorted, drums (are) hard and funky". Singer Kirsten Ross' vocal ability was praised, saying that she "can screech and croon with equally devastating effect." The Skinny praised the sound, calling it "a wall of no-frills rock n' roll that commands full attention immediately, with catchy seventies-styled guitar-licks". The List felt "the songs are decent, but personnel is their strong point. The drummer provides some refreshing on stage banter and front lady Kirsten Ross possesses enough charm to entrap the audience." In another review, the Daily Record wrote "(while) Little Doses don't take themselves too seriously, the Edinburgh-based quartet certainly know how to write a good tune and put on a good show."

== Band members ==
Current members

- Kirsten Ross – lead vocals (2006–present)
- Mark McClelland – bass guitar, backing vocals (2006–present)
- Michael Branagh – drums, backing vocals (2006–present)
- Mike Skinner – guitar (2009–2012)
- Chris Alderson – guitar (2009–present)

Former members

- Paul Mellon – lead guitar (2006–2007)
- Laurence Lean – lead guitar (2007–2008)
- Richard Beeby – lead guitar (March 2008–May 2009)

== Discography ==
Album

- Rock Riot Soul (2012)

Demos

- Chamber Studio Session (2007)
- The Chemical Session (2007)

Known songs

Song	Demo/Show
"Stolen Cars (Demo)"	Chamber Studio Session
"Monster in Me (Demo)"	Chamber Studio Session
"Slow Burn"	The Chemical Session
"The Fall and Angel"	The Chemical Session
"Every Hit You've Ever Heard"	Live @ The Mill 04.12.08
"Mile High"	Live @ The Mill 04.12.08
"Peace into War"	Live @ The Mill 04.12.08
"Juniper Hill"	

- A further eight half-finished tracks.
