= Ask Me How I Am =

2000 single by Snow Patrol

Single by Snow Patrol

from the album When It's All Over We Still Have to Clear Up
- Released: 20 November 2000
- Studio: Substation, CaVa, The Stables, Rage
- Length: 2:36
- Label: Jeepster
- Songwriters: Gary Lightbody; Mark McClelland; Jonny Quinn
- Producers: Michael Brennan Jr.; Snow Patrol

Snow Patrol singles chronology
"Starfighter Pilot" (1998)	"Ask Me How I Am" (2000)	"One Night Is Not Enough" (2001)

"Ask Me How I Am" is a song by Northern Irish alternative rock band Snow Patrol, released through Jeepster Records on 20 November 2000 as the lead single of their second album, When It's All Over We Still Have to Clear Up (2001). The song reached number 96 on the UK Singles Chart and the News Letter described the song's beat as funky.

== Music video ==
The music video for the song was warmly received by Hot Press, who called it "top-class". Reviewer Rory Cobbe wrote that the video was "clever" and the twist at the end "lovely". It further wrote that it was proof that a good idea can beat a "million pounds' worth of effects".

== Track listing ==
- Maxi CD
1. "Ask Me How I Am" – 2:36
2. "In Command of Cars" – 4:01
3. "Talk to the Trees" – 1:57

== Charts ==
Chart performance for "Ask Me How I Am"
Chart (2000)	Peak position
Scotland Singles (OCC)	74
UK Singles (OCC)	96
UK Indie (OCC)	25
