= When It's All Over We Still Have to Clear Up =

Studio album by Snow Patrol
- Released: 5 March 2001
- Recorded: 2000
- Studios: Substation, CaVa, The Stables, Rage
- Genres: Indie rock; alternative rock; post-Britpop
- Length: 47:44
- Label: Jeepster
- Producers: Snow Patrol; Michael Brennan

Snow Patrol chronology
Songs for Polarbears (1998)	When It's All Over We Still Have to Clear Up (2001)	Final Straw (2003)

Singles from When It's All Over We Still Have to Clear Up
- 1. "Ask Me How I Am" Released: 20 November 2000; 2. "One Night Is Not Enough" Released: 5 March 2001

When It's All Over We Still Have to Clear Up is the second studio album by Northern Irish alternative rock band Snow Patrol, released on 5 March 2001 in the United States and 24 April in the United Kingdom.

The album charted at number 129 in the UK and failed to sell well upon its initial release, but its re-release saw it eventually go gold in the UK.

== Background ==
The album was to be titled Santa Maria, and by June 2000, newer material like "Chased By... I Don't Know What", "Black and Blue" and "One Night Is Not Enough" was making its way into live performances. However, the album's release was held over for six months. Gary Lightbody used this time to write more songs. "Run", "Chocolate" and "Spitting Games" were written during this period, and later appeared on the next album Final Straw. On the tour following the release in March 2001, the band introduced "Run" to their audience, who received it very positively. In Lightbody's words: "I remember people's jaws dropping, and the applause going on for longer than any of our other songs."

== Reception ==
Professional ratings
Review scores
Source	Rating
AllMusic	4/5 stars
Entertainment.ie	3/5 stars
Hot Press	11/12
NME	5/10
PopMatters	6/10 stars
Pitchfork	7.6/10
RTÉ	5/5 stars
The Trades	A
Yahoo! Music	8/10 stars

Hot Press' Fiona Reid's review of the album was extremely favourable, who found the album had plenty of "magical moments". She felt that the album "reaches a quiet place within the chaos", and declared it was a "classic". She rated the album 11 out of 12. It was ranked #50 in CMJ New Music Top 75 in August 2001. Scott Juba of the website The Trades also praised the album, describing it along with its predecessor Songs for Polarbears as "wonderful", giving special acclaim to the track "An Olive Grove Facing the Sea".

== Track listing ==
All lyrics are written by Gary Lightbody; all music is composed by Gary Lightbody, Mark McClelland and Jonny Quinn.

No.	Title	Length
1.	"Never Gonna Fall in Love Again"	2:10
2.	"Ask Me How I Am"	2:34
3.	"Making Enemies"	4:18
4.	"Black and Blue"	3:40
5.	"Last Ever Lone Gunman"	2:43
6.	"If I'd Found the Right Words to Say"	4:47
7.	"Batten Down the Hatch"	3:29
8.	"One Night Is Not Enough"	3:23
9.	"Chased by... I Don't Know What"	2:41
10.	"On/Off"	2:40
11.	"An Olive Grove Facing the Sea"	5:18
12.	"When It's All Over We Still Have to Clear Up"	3:17
13.	"Make Love to Me Forever"	2:55
14.	"Firelight"	3:43

=== 2006 re-release bonus tracks ===
No.	Title	Length
15.	"In Command of Cars"	3.59
16.	"Talk to the Trees"	1:57
17.	"Monkey Mobe"	1:16
18.	"Workwear Shop"	2:25
19.	"Ask Me How I Am" (video)	2:44

- All bonus tracks originally appeared as B-sides to the singles released from When It's All Over We Still Have to Clear Up.

=== 2019 remaster bonus tracks ===
No.	Title	Length
15.	"Hollow as I Am"	2:35
16.	"And Then I'm Gonna"	2:59

== Personnel ==
Snow Patrol

- Gary Lightbody – vocals, guitar, piano, keyboards, backing vocals
- Mark McClelland – bass guitar, piano, keyboards, extra vocals on track 7
- Jonny Quinn – drums, extra vocals on track 7

Other personnel

- Liam Saunders – electric piano on track 3
- Mick Cooke – flugelhorn, trumpet on track 3
- Stuart Murdoch – piano on tracks 6, 14
- Kevin Lynch – extra vocals on track 7
- Rob Dillam – feedback guitar on track 8; acoustic guitar on track 11
- Richard Colburn – percussion on track 9
- Fly by Heart – choir on track 11
- John Todd – trumpet on track 11
- Peter Harvey – cello on track 12
- David Burke – viola on track 12
- Caroline Evans – violin on track 12
- Michael Brennan, Jr. – producer

== Charts ==
Chart performance for When It's All Over We Still Have to Clear Up
Chart	Peak position
UK Albums Chart	129

== Certifications ==
Certifications for When It's All Over We Still Have to Clear Up
Organization	Level	Date
BPI (UK)	Silver	3 February 2006
BPI (UK)	Gold	15 June 2007
