= One Night Is Not Enough =

2001 single by Snow Patrol

Single by Snow Patrol

from the album When It's All Over We Still Have to Clear Up
- Released: 5 March 2001
- Studio: Substation, CaVa, The Stables, Rage
- Length: 3:25
- Label: Jeepster
- Songwriters: Gary Lightbody; Mark McClelland; Jonny Quinn
- Producers: Michael Brennan Jr.; Snow Patrol

Snow Patrol singles chronology
"Ask Me How I Am" (2000)	"One Night Is Not Enough" (2001)	"Spitting Games" (2003)

"One Night Is Not Enough" is a song by Northern Irish alternative rock band Snow Patrol, released through Jeepster Records on 5 March 2001 as the second and final single of their second album, When It's All Over We Still Have to Clear Up (2001). The band was later dropped by Jeepster after the single's release. The song peaked at number 92 on the UK Singles Chart.

== Reception ==
NME's Alex Needham reviewed the single negatively saying the song "feels like a lifetime - and one nobody sane would be in a hurry to return to, either." He said that it "hits you like a shot of pure camphor, taking you back to those dark, pre-CD:UK days when The Chart Show used to run down the indie chart." He went on to criticize Snow Patrol, calling them "too poor and unimaginative to have made videos."

== Track listings ==
Maxi CD

1. "One Night Is Not Enough" – 3:26
2. "Monkey Mobe" – 1:18
3. "Workwear Shop" – 2:25

Promo CD

1. "One Night Is Not Enough" – 3:22

== Charts ==
Chart (2001)	Peak position
Scotland Singles (OCC)	93
UK Singles (OCC)	92
UK Indie (OCC)	11
