= An Olive Grove Facing the Sea =

2009 single by Snow Patrol

Song by Snow Patrol

from the album When It's All Over We Still Have to Clear Up
- Released: 5 March 2001
- Recorded: 2000
- Studio: Substation, CaVa, The Stables, Rage
- Genre: Alternative rock; dream pop
- Length: 5:18
- Label: Jeepster Records
- Songwriters: Gary Lightbody; Mark McClelland; Jonny Quinn
- Producers: Snow Patrol; Michael Brennan, Jr.

"An Olive Grove Facing the Sea (2009 Version)"

Single by Snow Patrol

from the album Up to Now
- Released: 4 December 2009
- Recorded: July 2009
- Studio: The Garage (Kent, England)
- Length: 4:59
- Label: Fiction; Interscope
- Songwriters: Gary Lightbody; Mark McClelland; Jonny Quinn
- Producer: Jacknife Lee

Snow Patrol singles chronology
"Just Say Yes" (2009)	"An Olive Grove Facing the Sea (2009 Version)" (2009)	"Called Out in the Dark" (2011)

"An Olive Grove Facing the Sea" is a song by Northern Irish alternative rock band Snow Patrol from their second album, When It's All Over We Still Have to Clear Up (2001). A re-recorded version featuring only vocalist Gary Lightbody's singing and guitar was released on the band's first compilation album, Up to Now (2009) and was later released digitally as the second single of the album.

== Background ==
The lyrics to the song were written by vocalist Gary Lightbody, and the music composed by the whole band, then consisting of Lightbody, Mark McClelland and Jonny Quinn. The original album version was recorded by Snow Patrol during the sessions for their second album, When It's All Over We Still Have to Clear Up. Recording took place at two different studios: The Stables (in Lincolnshire, England) and Substation (in Rosyth, Scotland). The final mix was done at Substation. The song was produced by Michael Brennan Jr. and Snow Patrol. The song has been described as possibly being "a dream", "a hymn to an imagined presence" and also a "mermaid fantasy", because of its lyrics: "She was an angel / I saw her swimming there". It has also been compared to the Big Star song "Thirteen" and called its "Stalkers Handbook" version. The start of the song features acoustic guitar, whose strings are "brushed gently" and the cymbals played for "reverberation and resonance", instead of being "struck for impact", according to Stylus' writer Nick Southall. He has noted that the drumming is "slow and deliberate", and repeated, because "dreams repeat". As the song reaches the chorus, the acoustic guitar stops and an electric one takes over. The end of the song features a trumpet solo as cadenza. Lightbody's vocal on the song invited comparisons to Nick Drake.

Gary Lightbody re-recorded the original version in July 2009 at The Garage in Kent, with Jacknife Lee acting as producer. The new recording was called the "2009 Version" and featured Lightbody singing over an electric guitar. Lightbody called his new version "shamefully self indulgent".

== Music video ==
Snow Patrol filmed a music video for the song on 24 May 2001. It was created with mneTV as a part of the @ìre series, which was broadcast on BBC Two and STV. mneTV's Cailean Collier wrote that since the song had been described as a dream, the video interprets this by "blurring the borders between fantasy and reality".

== Release and reception ==
Snow Patrol's recording was released on their second album When It's All Over We Still Have to Clear Up in 2001, and 2006, when the album was re-released. Lightbody's re-recording, the "2009 Version", was released on Snow Patrol's first compilation Up to Now. It was later released as the second single from the compilation on 4 December 2009. A digital only single, it was released on the UK iTunes Store. It was also given away as a freebie for a day on the 1st day (26 December 2009) of iTunes' 12 Days of Christmas.

"An Olive Grove Facing the Sea" has been mostly praised by critics. It has been called "pretty" and "affecting" and been praised for employing an orchestra. It has also been called an example of the "lo-fi rustic beauty" of the band's early records. In a negative review, RTÉ said that the downbeat nature of the song was eerie. It was criticized (along with the whole album) for being "ill-timed" and having "misspent emotions". In later years, it has been called a "stone cold classic" and "a bona fide tear jerker". UK magazine Drowned in Sound in 2009 named it the song to be played to anyone who didn't have enough respect for Snow Patrol as a band. Scott Juba, writing for website The Trades, praised it as "the real highlight of the two LPs" (Songs for Polarbears and When It's All Over We Still Have to Clear Up). He went on to describe it as "one of the best songs" he'd ever heard, and that it "paints a beautiful picture of love's yearnings and contains enough quiet drama and soothing emotion to completely engross the listener in every word of the eloquently penned lyrics".

== Track listing ==
- UK iTunes:
1. "An Olive Grove Facing the Sea" (2009 Version) – 4:59

== Personnel ==
Snow Patrol

- Gary Lightbody – guitar, vocals
- Mark McClelland – bass
- Jonny Quinn – drums

Other personnel

- Fly by Heart – choir
- Rob Dillam – acoustic guitar
- John Todd – trumpet
