= Stables Theatre =

The Stables Theatre may refer to more than one topic

- Stables Theatre, Sydney in Darlinghurst, also known as the SBW Stables Theatre
- The Stables, a theatre and music venue in Wavendon, Milton Keynes
