= Olive grove (disambiguation) =

An olive grove is a small group of Olea europaea trees.

Olive grove may also refer to:

- Olive Grove, Sheffield Wednesday F.C.'s first permanent football ground
- Olive Grove, a suburb of Somerset West, South Africa
- Olive Grove Elementary School, a school in California serving grades K-5
- "An Olive Grove Facing the Sea", a song by Snow Patrol
