= How to Be Dead =

2004 single by Snow Patrol

Single by Snow Patrol

from the album Final Straw
- Released: 25 October 2004
- Studio: Britannia Row, The Diving Bell
- Genre: Indie rock, alternative rock
- Length: 3:23
- Label: Fiction, Polydor
- Songwriters: Gary Lightbody, Nathan Connolly, Mark McClelland, Jonny Quinn
- Producer: Jacknife Lee

Snow Patrol singles chronology
| "Spitting Games (re-release)" (2004) | "How to Be Dead" (2004) | "You're All I Have" (2006) |

"How to Be Dead" is a song by Northern Irish alternative rock band Snow Patrol, released on 25 October 2004 as the fourth and final single of their third album, Final Straw (2003). The single's release was slightly remixed by Chris Lord-Alge from the album version and reached number 39 in the United Kingdom and number 42 in Ireland.

The song is a downtempo rock ballad, with lyrics detailing a conversation between a couple.

== Reception ==
Yahoo! Music's Jairne Gill reviewed the single positively, giving it 7 stars out of 10. Though he felt Snow Patrol usually made "ugly empty anthems", the single was a "rather lovely little song" and "modest" and "chimingly melodic". Gill praised the lyrics of the song, calling it "a pretty little knife which Gary Lightbody seems to be twisting into his own chest, a list of druggy regrets and lost loves" and also said that, though the song's "gentle, skipping rhythm threatens to go BIG", it doesn't and "a pretty and intimate song is preserved".

== Track listings ==
CD

1. "How to Be Dead" (Chris Lord-Alge Mix) – 3:23
2. "You Are My Joy" (Live at Somerset House) – 3:20
3. "Chocolate" (Grand National Mix) – 4:58

Germany 3" CD

1. "How to Be Dead" (Chris Lord-Alge Mix) – 3:23
2. "You Are My Joy" (Live at Somerset House) – 3:20

7"

1. "How to Be Dead" (Chris Lord-Alge Mix) – 3:23
2. "You Are My Joy" (Live at Somerset House) – 3:20

Promo CD

1. "How to Be Dead" (Chris Lord-Alge Edited Mix) – 3:12

== Charts ==
| Chart (2004) | Peak position |
|---|---|
| Ireland (IRMA) | 42 |
| Scotland Singles (OCC) | 32 |
| UK Singles (OCC) | 39 |

== In popular culture ==
"How to Be Dead" was featured on the soundtracks to American Pie: Band Camp and Wicker Park.
