= Listen... Tanks! =

Northern Irish avant-garde music group

- Origin: Northern Ireland
- Genres: Avant-garde, experimental, psychedelic pop, trip-hop, drone, Russian submarine music
- Years active: 2007–present
- Members: Gary Lightbody; Jacknife Lee

Listen... Tanks! is an avant-garde music group, consisting of Gary Lightbody (of Snow Patrol) and producer Jacknife Lee, who has produced the last three albums for Snow Patrol, among others. The group's music is very different from Snow Patrol and has been termed "weird" by Lightbody. The group will visit Lee's home in January 2010 to record an album, after they finish working on another project Tired Pony.

== History ==
Listen... Tanks! evolved after experiments in the studio between Gary Lighbody and Jacknife Lee. Lightbody has credited indie rock band Sunset Rubdown's second album Shut Up I Am Dreaming as inspiration to himself and Lee to start the project. Both Lightbody and Lee play all the instruments. The only known song by the group is "Black and Silver", which was premiered on BBC Radio 1 on 10 January 2007 by Lightbody himself, while he was guest presenting for Zane Lowe (who was on vacation) during the 2007 takeovers. The sound of the song was described by Hot Press as "heavily treated vocals and assorted electronic clicks and beeps". NME described it as having a "heavily processed arrangement, pitching an ominous multi-tracked vocal backing against glockenspiels and Lightbody’s vocal". Lightbody himself sees the song as "a strange, little, dark, country, folkish beast." Apart from "Black and Silver", more music has been recorded, whose direction has been branded by Lightbody as a "mad turn".

"Tanks is a very strange beast. We turn a noise-making machine on, kick an amp around and go from there. It's fucking weird."

— Gary Lightbody

In May 2009, Lightbody revealed plans of releasing material in an album called Listen Tank. He described the group's sound as "russian submarine music", explaining that the record utilizes a lot more voice than the guitar, the result sounding like a choir performing underwater. Due to the radical differences from typical Snow Patrol, he doesn't expect every fan to like it. Lightbody has taken a year-off from Snow Patrol to work on the project. Lightbody has hinted at the possible inclusion of a few guests on the record, but nothing has been confirmed. The duo will visit Lee's Los Angeles home in January 2010 to finish the album after they finish working on another Lightbody side-project, Tired Pony.
