= Late Night Tales: Snow Patrol =

Compilation album by Snow Patrol
- Released: 21 September 2009
- Recorded: Jacobs Studios, Farnham; Mayfair Studios, London
- Genres: Alternative rock, house, electronic, indie rock, rap
- Length: 67:59
- Label: Night Time Stories
- Producers: Gary Lightbody, Tom Simpson
- Compilers: Gary Lightbody, Tom Simpson

Snow Patrol chronology
| The Trip: Created by Snow Patrol (2004) | Late Night Tales: Snow Patrol (2009) | Up to Now (2009) |

Late Night Tales chronology
| Late Night Tales: Matt Helders (2008) | Late Night Tales: Snow Patrol (2009) | Late Night Tales: The Cinematic Orchestra (2010) |

Late Night Tales: Snow Patrol is a mix album compiled by alternative rock band Snow Patrol's members Gary Lightbody and Tom Simpson and released through Night Time Stories in September and October 2009. The album is the 22nd in the Late Night Tales series. It was recorded at Jacobs Studios in Farnham & Mayfair Studios in London, and was produced by compilers Lightbody and Simpson.

Any compiling artist to Late Night Tales is required to add a track of their own. Snow Patrol recorded INXS's "New Sensation" for the occasion. Lightbody was confident about the cover, and said: "why bother if you're just palely imitating the true form?" Will Self is featured on the series again (after Late Night Tales: Groove Armada), with the second part of his short story, called "The Happy Detective (Part 2)". Simpson and Lightbody created an exclusive mini-mix, which was not featured on the album but could be listened on the Late Night Tales website. An alternate version, dubbed Another Late Night Tale: Snow Patrol was released on iTunes with selected tracks, and a continuous mix of the whole album. The album was released to positive reception by music critics.

== Track listing ==
| No. | Title | Artist(s) | Length |
|---|---|---|---|
| 1. | "Observatory Crest" | Captain Beefheart | 3:22 |
| 2. | "Midnight" | A Tribe Called Quest | 3:10 |
| 3. | "Dark Lady" | DJ Food | 2:32 |
| 4. | "I Walk the Earth" | King Biscuit Time | 3:20 |
| 5. | "Canal Song (End of Sentence)" | Iain Archer | 4:33 |
| 6. | "Ordinary Joe" | Terry Callier | 4:07 |
| 7. | "It's All Gone Quiet" | The Week That Was | 3:16 |
| 8. | "Last Train" | Allen Toussaint | 2:48 |
| 9. | "Fancy" | Bobbie Gentry | 4:08 |
| 10. | "That's Us/Wild Combination" | Arthur Russell | 4:40 |
| 11. | "Eanie Meany" | Jim Noir | 2:23 |
| 12. | "Half Asleep" | School of Seven Bells | 3:32 |
| 13. | "Family Tree" | TV on the Radio | 4:49 |
| 14. | "Hold On" | Holy Ghost! | 3:06 |
| 15. | "Download" | Super Furry Animals | 3:01 |
| 16. | "New Sensation" (INXS cover) | Snow Patrol | 3:32 |
| 17. | "Next Train" | Miracle Fortress | 4:00 |
| 18. | "Sweet Little Mystery" | John Martyn | 5:34 |
| 19. | "The Happy Detective (Part 2)" | Will Self | 2:06 |

iTunes release
| No. | Title | Artist(s) | Length |
|---|---|---|---|
| 1. | "Observatory Crest" | Captain Beefheart | 3:22 |
| 2. | "Midnight" | A Tribe Called Quest | 3:10 |
| 3. | "Dark Lady" | DJ Food | 2:32 |
| 4. | "I Walk the Earth" | King Biscuit Time | 3:20 |
| 5. | "Canal Song (End of Sentence)" | Iain Archer | 4:33 |
| 6. | "It's All Gone Quiet" | The Week That Was | 3:16 |
| 7. | "Fancy" | Bobbie Gentry | 4:08 |
| 8. | "That's Us/Wild Combination" | Arthur Russell | 4:40 |
| 9. | "Eanie Meany" | Jim Noir | 2:23 |
| 10. | "Half Asleep" | School of Seven Bells | 3:32 |
| 11. | "Hold On" | Holy Ghost! | 3:06 |
| 12. | "New Sensation" (INXS cover) | Snow Patrol | 3:32 |
| 13. | "Sweet Little Mystery" | John Martyn | 5:34 |
| 14. | "The Happy Detective (Part 2)" | Will Self | 2:06 |
| 15. | "Snow Patrol Late Night Tales (Continuous Mix)" | Late Night Tales | 54:06 |

== Release and reception ==
The album was released on 28 September 2009 in the UK and 3 November 2009 in the US. in two formats, CD and Digital download. The download was available in MP3 and WAV formats, each set priced at £7.99. The album booklet contains the story behind the song selection, and a short story detailing how Lightbody and Simpson first met; a party Lightbody went to where Simpson was DJing. Album compilers Lightbody and Simpson (along with Richard Colburn of Belle & Sebastian) played a DJ Set at the album's launch party at London's The Old Queens Head pub. The event was held on 13 November 2009 between 8pm–2am and was free for everyone.

Professional ratings
Review scores
| Source | Rating |
|---|---|
| Allmusic | 3/5 stars |
| California Chronicle | (favorable) |
| Clash Music | (6/10) |
| The Pitt News | (favorable) |

Critical response towards the album was generally positive. Hot Press felt that the band had made "New Sensation" as their own song, saying it was "well and truly patroled". The album was received quite favorably by Nick Annan of Clash Music, who called the song selection "cracking". Though he didn't feel the songs would work well in a party environment, he felt they were "prime" for a listening session and rated the album 6 out of 10. Allmusic's Andrew Leahey awarded the album 3 stars out of 5. He called the album "surprisingly moody, stylish, and fairly danceable". He said the songs "slyly" blended into each other and praised the compilers' (Lightbody and Simpson) DJing abilities. He noted that there is a constant nocturnal ambiance present throughout the album, which was necessary for a Late Night Tales release. He found the band's cover of "New Sensation" a close match to the quality of the remaining album. He suggested "Observatory Crest", "Last Train" and the cover of "New Sensation" as track picks. The Pitt News' reviewer Azia Squire felt that the only "mishaps" of the album were Snow Patrol's cover of "New Sensation" and Miracle Fortress' "Next Train". She said though they were strong songs, they sounded "awkward" on the compilation, as their energy was not high enough. She however, praised the band saying it was proof that Snow Patrol could make "excellent music."

== Personnel ==
- Gary Lightbody – compiled by, producer
- Tom Simpson – compiled by, producer

== Release history ==
| Country/Region | Date | Format |
|---|---|---|
| Worldwide | 21 September 2009 | iTunes |
| United Kingdom | 28 September 2009 | Compact disc |
| Worldwide (Except US) | 28 September 2009 | Digital download |
| Worldwide (Except US) | 20 October 2009 | Compact disc |
| United States | 3 November 2009 | Compact disc |
