= Cut La Roc =

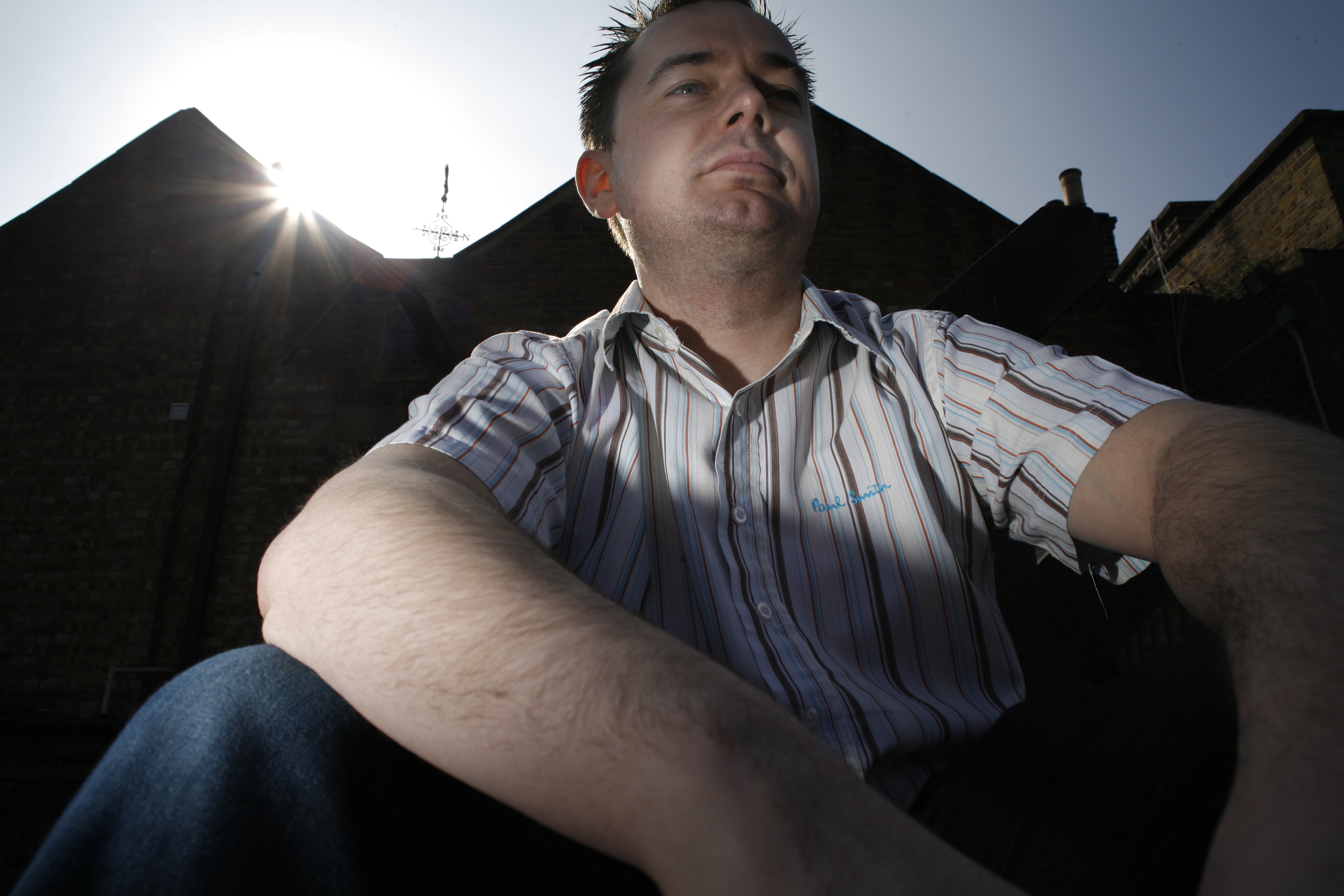
- Cut La Roc in 2007

Background information
- Born: Lee Potter; 11 January 1972 (age 54)
- Origin: Brighton, England
- Genres: Big beat; electronic; trip hop; house
- Occupations: DJ, producer, musician, songwriter
- Instruments: Turntables, percussion, programming
- Years active: 1989–present
- Labels: Rocstar, Skint
- Website: Cut La Roc on Myspace

Lee Potter (born 11 January 1972), known by his stage name Cut La Roc, is a British electronic musician, considered as a pioneer of big beat, a genre fusing elements of hip hop, house and rock.

== Biography ==
Potter grew up in Brighton, England, and was signed to the British record label, Rocstar Recordings.

He started creating and producing music when acid house came on at the end of the eighties. In an interview he described the cause of his "infection" for electronic music and DJing: "I'd never really liked house music up until then, but this was kind of different, because it had the hip-hop element through the breakbeats, it made total sense to me".

In 1998, he released "Post Punk Progression" which NME lauded as "what the Beatles would have sounded like if they'd invented jungle".

In 1999, Cut La Roc produced and released a mix album for the Ministry of Sound's FSUK imprint and performed and produced with 9 decks. He spent three years consistently DJing in Australia, the United States, Europe and Asia.

His DJ sets feature old school hip hop and G-funk to modern hip hop and trap. In 1995, Cut La Roc appeared on BBC One's Top of the Pops as the late electronic musician Wildchild on the original version of "Renegade Master", before Fatboy Slim remixed and revived the song in 1998. In 2001, he produced along with Snow Patrol's Gary Lightbody, the songs "Fallen" and "Mishka". As well as Lightbody co-producing both of the songs, he also provided the vocals. Cut La Roc held a four-year residency at the 'Big Beat Boutique' and performed alongside fellow big beat musicians Fatboy Slim and Armand Van Helden.
