= Run (Snow Patrol song) =

2004 song by Snow Patrol

Single by Snow Patrol

from the album Final Straw
- B-side: "Post Punk Progression"
- Released: 26 January 2004
- Recorded: 2003
- Studio: Britannia Row (London, England); The Diving Bell Lounge (Glasgow, Scotland)
- Genre: Britpop; post-Britpop
- Length: 5:56 (album version); 4:16 (radio edit)
- Label: Fiction; Polydor
- Songwriters: Gary Lightbody; Nathan Connolly; Mark McClelland; Jonathan Quinn; Iain Archer
- Producers: Jacknife Lee; Snow Patrol

Snow Patrol singles chronology
"Spitting Games" (2003)	"Run" (2004)	"Chocolate" (2004)

"Run" is a song by Northern Irish alternative rock band Snow Patrol, released in the United Kingdom on 26 February 2004 as the second single of their third album, Final Straw (2003). The song was conceived in 2000 by frontman Gary Lightbody after an accident he had during a bender. "Run" has been described as a Britpop power ballad. It received critical acclaim, and was compared to Coldplay's "Yellow".

A music video, directed by Paul Gore, was released to promote the song; in it, band members use distress flares and motorcycles at night. An unreleased video, directed by Mark Pellington, was also filmed. The single reached the top five on the UK Singles Chart in 2004, and since it has appeared multiple times in the chart. Additionally, "Run" reached the Top 40 of Ireland, the Netherlands and the American Modern Rock Tracks.

"Run" has been covered by multiple artists, including Leona Lewis, who released it as a single in November 2008. Her performance received critical and commercial success, topping the charts of Austria, Ireland, Portugal and the United Kingdom, and becoming the UK's fastest-ever-selling download.

== Background ==
Snow Patrol's frontman, Gary Lightbody, conceived the idea of writing "Run" in 2000. In an interview with Michael Odell, from Q magazine, Lightbody explained the song was not written about "being a child", as he tended to say. He described: "I was on a massive bender and one night I was drinking in the bar of the Glasgow School of Art. I fell down a full flight of stairs. Jonny Quinn found me in the stairwell with blood coming out of my head ... I split my head open and my eye was closed and I lost a few teeth ... I wrote Run soon after on this little guitar I'd tried to smash up in my shitty little room near Hillhead. The words 'Light up, light up' gave me this sense of a beacon." Besides Lightbody, it was written by Quinn, Nathan Connolly, Mark McClelland and Iain Archer.

== Composition ==
"Run"
"Run" includes guitar riffs, as noted by Adrienne Day from Spin.

"Run" is a Britpop power ballad composed using common time in the key of C major, with a tempo of 72 beats per minute. It is written in the common verse–chorus form, and its chord progression goes Am–Fmaj7/A–Gsus4, it repeats once, and later it changes to Am–F6/C–Gsus4, which also repeats one time, and then the sequence restarts. Lightbody's vocal range performs from A3 to F5, and the song features bass guitar, cello, drums, guitars, viola and violins as its musical instruments. Adrienne Day wrote for Spin that "Run" includes "guitar riffs", whilst Joe Bosso described the song as "dark and moody".

A reviewer for Contactmusic.com commented about "Run". In its introduction includes a "trembling guitar", Lightbody's vocals as "velvet soft", and its refrain as "stirring stuff". Irish writer Peter Murphy called it a "strange hybrid", explaining it is "a lighter-waving anthem drenched in private grieving". Kevin Forest Moreau considered "Run" to have "plaintive lyrics, rigorous strumming, sweeping strings and a hook that yanks without reservation for the heartstrings of adolescent girls everywhere". Claire Simpson described it as an "angst-ridden guitar ballad".

== Critical reception ==
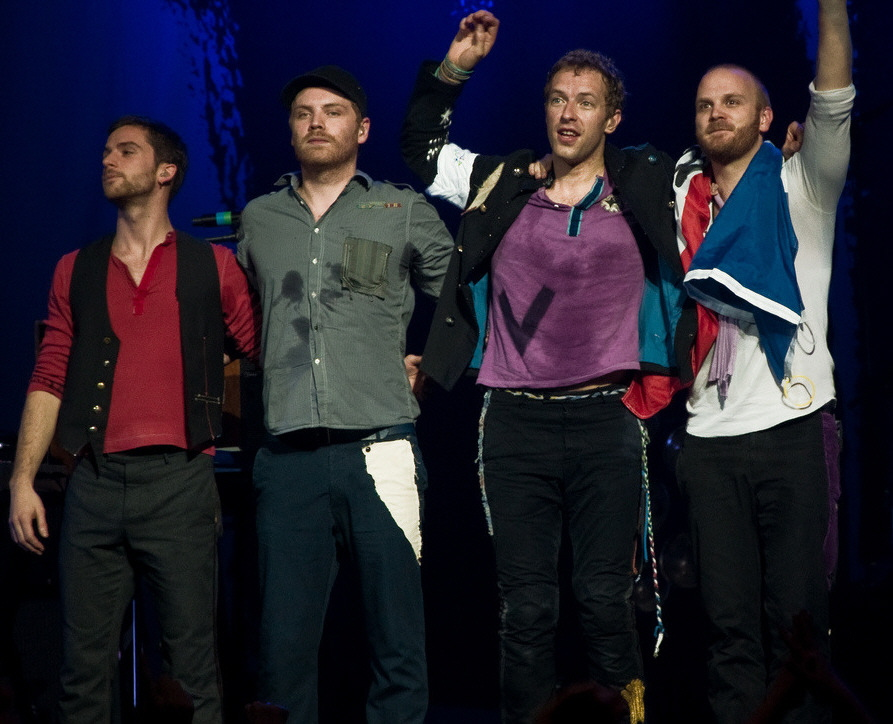
Snow Patrol's performance was compared by music critics to songs by Coldplay (pictured in 2008).

"Run" received widespread acclaim from music critics. Claire Simpson highlighted the track, Adrienne Day called the song "brilliant", and Jacky McCarthy, from Billboard, described it as "memorable", due to the band displays "a lush melody, soaring chorus and [Lightbody's] brooding vocals. Irish musician, Shane O'Neill, said he wept when he first heard it play." Andrew Beaujon added it to Spin's playlist of "songs you need to know", and wrote it is "the year's most fantastically overblown Britpop power ballad". Mikael Wood from the same magazine compared "Run" to British band Coldplay song "Yellow", as he said it is a "pro-smoking epic [song that] challenges the cell-phone-waving majesty of 'Yellow'", a feeling Douglas Wolk of Rolling Stone had as well. Josh Modell of The A.V. Club commented it grabs the baton from "Yellow" and "takes it for a weepy, grandiose jog". John Murphy considered its "slow burning delights" replaced the piano chords of Coldplay's "Clocks", which, according to him, started to sound "annoying".

Marc Vera of Entertainment Weekly magazine described "Run"'s lyrics as "haunting of romantic distress", and its guitars as "walls [that] should put Coldplay on notice". Stephen M. Deusner of Pitchfork Media also compared "Run" to Coldplay and he wrote it "exists solely for its uplifting, if oddly fatalistic, chorus ... which will surely have concertgoers raising their lighters during the inevitable second-encore singalong". He continued saying it is an "unapologetically anthemic" in which "[Jacknife] Lee throws in some schmaltzy strings at the climax that practically cry out to score the big smooch in some teen-friendly romantic comedy." Kevin Forest Moreau considered its lyrics as "unrestrained earnestness". Whilst an Uncut magazine reviewer marked it as a highlight, Devon Powers wrote for PopMatters it is "easy and lush", and Paul Nolan considered it "the perfect modern hymn to broken relationships".

Lisa Oliver of Stylus Magazine commented "Run" has "raw tenderness", and listeners should not "listen to it in public—unless openly weeping in front of colleagues or commuters is not a concern". Christian Carey of Junkmedia.org called it, along with another song of Final Straw ("Grazed Knees"), a "symphonic pop gem", and the "most memorable" track of the album. Steven Gozdecki of Neumu.net called it "centerpiece" of the album and a "brilliantly entrancing" tune, and also noted it is "the song that Coldplay dream of making". Gozdecki complemented with "[it is] a moving ballad that benefits from the absence of that other band's dreadful, Dave Matthews-esque voice and omnipresent electric piano." Natasha Perry considered it to be a song "that sends shivers down the spine with a haunting verse and uplifting chorus". A reviewer for Sputnikmusic compared it to Snow Patrol song "Chasing Cars" (2006), which was described as "beautiful".

Steve Hands for OHM commented "Run" is "the kind of rueful facing-up-to-life type anthem" and added it is a "decent stab" for radio stations like XFM and Virgin Radio, a reviewer of Contactmusic.com called it "shimmering", and Dom Gourlay of Drowned in Sound gave the song a rating of 8/10. Virgin Music listed "Run" 8 in their list of "Top pub sing-along anthems". It appeared at number 874 of "The Rock 1000" list of "best rock songs of all time", published by New Zealander radio station The Rock FM. Emma Taylor and Lorelei Sharkey, Em & Lo, listed "Run" at number 69 of their "Top 100 Breakup Songs of All Time", in their book The Ultimate Guide to Dumping and Getting Dumped. Along with the song "Same", "Run" is one of the favourite Snow Patrol songs of American heavy metal band Mötley Crüe member Tommy Lee.

== Chart performance ==
After its release as single, "Run" entered the Irish Singles Chart when it debuted and peaked at number 25 on 29 January 2004. The song stayed within the top 50 for 5 weeks, and it left it on number 41. In the United Kingdom, the song debuted and peaked at number 5 on the UK Singles Chart, on 7 February 2004. The next week, the song fell to number 8, and managed to continue in the top 40 for another 4 weeks. In the United States, the song entered the top 30 of the Billboard Modern Rock Tracks charts, now titled Alternative Songs, at number 30 on 28 August 2004. On 30 October, it reached number 15, its peak position. The song left the chart on 25 December, after 19 weeks. In the Netherlands, "Run" debuted on 7 August 2004 at number 88 on the Single Top 100 chart. Two weeks later, the song rose to its peak position, at number 71, and stayed there for a week. The song dropped out the chart on 11 September of the same year. In 2005, it reentered the chart twice, on 19 February at number 95, and on 5 March at number 97. It also peaked at number 19 on the Dutch Top 40.

In 2007, "Run" re-entered the UK Singles Chart at number 147. In 2008, British singer Leona Lewis covered the song in multiple radio and television programmes. After Lewis performed it on The X Factor, Snow Patrol's version re-entered the UK Singles Chart at number 28. The next year, in October, the song debuted the German Singles Chart at number 92, whilst in November the song reentered the UK Singles Chart at number 63. In 2010, after Snow Patrol re-released "Run", it re-appeared on the Dutch Top 40 at number 22 for three weeks, on the Dutch Single Top 100 at number 75, and the UK Singles Chart at 133. In Belgium, it charted the Ultratip at number 8 in the region of Flanders, whilst in the Walloon Region at number 6 of the same chart.

== Music video ==
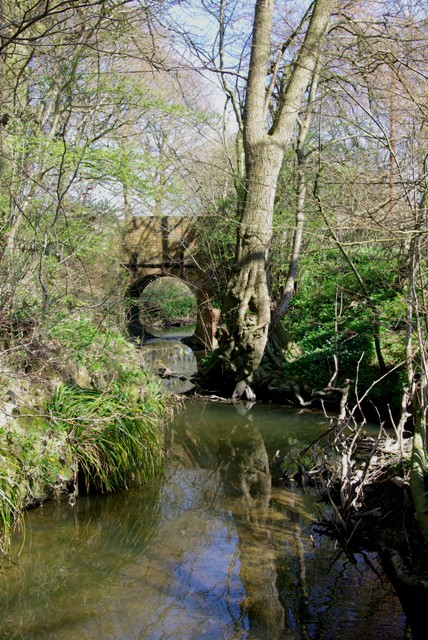
Picture of a stream located in Kent. The music video for "Run" was filmed in a similar location

The music video for "Run" was filmed in September 2003, in a remote area of the county of Kent. It was directed by Paul Gore, produced by Suzie Morton through the company Flynn Productions, photographed by Ben Smithard, and edited by Tony Kearns, and it premiered in October 2003. During filming, people from the area called the police, because they noticed several red distress flares were used at night, which were those Snow Patrol members used.

The video starts with Lightbody, who wears a dark coat, a grey polo neck sweater, and trousers. He sings as he pushes an old motorcycle across a farmer's field at dusk. As darkness falls, he abandons the bike and enters a wood. He walks through it, until he descends a short hill and stays in a stream. As the chorus begins, Lightbody lights a distress firelight, he moves it in circles as he sings. In a bridge behind him, two members from Snow Patrol light two flares and move them as well. When the chorus ends, Lighbody throws his flare to the water, in which it continues shining. Lightbody returns to the forest and he sings while he walks. Later, he ascends to a plain, where another two members ignite two distress firelights as the second verse ends. With the flares, they run and move them in circles, and then, they throw them to each other. Nathan Connolly, who wears a grey hoodie, appears riding the motorcycle Lightbody dumped. He drives it in zigzag with the other men. As the video ends, he goes to the stream, where the motorbike starts to throw smoke; Connolly gets off it, and it fires. The burning bike rolls downhill and it falls into the stream, where it sinks, with the fire being extinguished.

An unreleased music video directed by Mark Pellington was uploaded to his Vimeo.

== Usage in other media ==
"Run" appeared in various television programs and films including One Tree Hill, Life as We Know It, Cold Case, Rescue Me, Doctor Who Confidential, Jericho, Mad Dogs and Bates Motel.

Katharine McPhee performed the song in the Smash episode "Publicity".

The song was included in the soundtrack to the film The Chumscrubber and the Top Gear compilation album The Ultimate Driving Experience.

The song was also used in a trailer for the 2006 action-adventure drama film The Guardian.

In 2024, the Leona Lewis cover of "Run" was featured in the spy action thriller Argylle.

In 2026, Alfie Boe covered the song for the Royal British Legion Festival of Remembrance.

== Track listing ==
- 7"

A. "Run" (Revised) – 5:56
B. "Post Punk Progression" – 3:23

- 10"

A. "Run" (Jacknife Lee Remix) – 7:27
B. "Run" (Freelance Hellraiser Remix) – 4:03

- CD single and digital download
1. "Run" (Revised) – 5:57
2. "Post Punk Progression" – 3:21
- Canada CD single
1. "Run" – 5:55
2. "Post Punk Progression" – 3:23
3. "Spitting Games" (2001 Country Version) – 4:16
4. "Run" (video) – 4:27
- "Run"
1. "Run" (Live from Edinburgh) – 5:01
- Run – EP
1. "Run" – 5:55
2. "Post Punk Progression" – 3:23
3. "Spitting Games" (2001 Country Version) – 4:16

== Personnel ==
"Run" was recorded at Britannia Row, located in London, England, and The Diving Bell Lounge Studios, in Glasgow, Scotland. Credits adapted from "Run" liner notes.

- Lead and backing vocals, guitars, keys, glockenspiel: Gary Lightbody
- Guitars, backing vocals: Nathan Connolly
- Bass, keyboards: Mark McClelland
- Cello: James Banbury
- Engineering: Michael Bannister, Dan Swift
- Drums: Jonny Quinn
- Lyrics: Gary Lightbody
- Mixer: Chris Lord-Alge, Snow Patrol
- Musical composition: Iain Archer, Nathan Connolly, Gary Lightbody, Mark McClelland, Lee Potter ("Post Punk Progression"/"PPP" only), Jonny Quinn
- Producer: Garret "Jacknife" Lee, Snow Patrol
- Photography: Ernst Fischer
- String arrangement: James Banbury
- String arrangement assistant: Jeff McLaughlin
- Viola: Bruce White
- Violin: Alison Dodds, Fiona McCapra
- Vocals: Gary Lightbody

== Charts ==
=== Weekly charts ===
Chart (2004–2010)	Peak position
Australia (ARIA)	76
Belgian Tip Chart (Flanders)	8
Belgian Tip Chart (Wallonia)	6
German Singles Chart	92
Irish Singles Chart	25
Netherlands (Dutch Top 40)	22
Netherlands (Single Top 100)	71
UK Singles (OCC)	5
UK Airplay (Music Week)	23
US Billboard Modern Rock Tracks	15

=== Year-end charts ===
Chart (2004)	Position
UK Singles (OCC)	120
UK Airplay (Music Week)	72
US Modern Rock Tracks (Billboard)	59

Chart (2010)	Position
Netherlands (Dutch Top 40)	107

== Certifications ==
Region	Certification	Certified units/sales
Australia (ARIA)	Gold	35,000^{‡}
New Zealand (RMNZ)	Gold	15,000^{‡}
United Kingdom (BPI)	2× Platinum	1,200,000^{‡}
^{‡} Sales+streaming figures based on certification alone.

== Leona Lewis version ==
"Run"

Single by Leona Lewis

from the album Spirit (deluxe edition)
- Released: 30 November 2008
- Recorded: September 2008
- Studio: Chalice Recording Studios (Los Angeles, CA); Doppler Studios (Atlanta, GA); Henson Recording Studios (Los Angeles, CA); Mansfield Studios (Los Angeles, CA); Record Plant (Los Angeles, CA)
- Genre: Pop
- Length: 5:14 (album version); 4:39 (single mix)
- Label: Syco; J
- Songwriters: Gary Lightbody; Jonathan Quinn; Mark McClelland; Nathan Connolly; Iain Archer
- Producer: Steve Robson

Leona Lewis singles chronology
"Forgive Me" (2008)	"Run" (2008)	"I Will Be" (2009)

British singer Leona Lewis covered "Run" on BBC Radio 1's Live Lounge on 31 October 2007. She later released the song as a single from Spirit: The Deluxe Edition in November 2008. At the time, "Run" was the UK's fastest-selling digital-only release ever, selling 69,244 copies in just two days. Upon its release as a single, Lewis performed "Run" on several televised shows, including The X Factor (UK),Top of the Pops and at the 80th Royal Variety Performance. She has also performed the song on the American and German versions of The X Factor, and it was included on the set list of her concert tours, The Labyrinth (2010), Glassheart Tour (2013) and I Am Tour (2016).

=== Background ===
Lewis first performed "Run" on the Live Lounge section of The Jo Whiley Show, where artists perform two songs: one song of their own and one by another artist, in an acoustic format. The performance was recorded at the BBC Maida Vale Studios, where Lewis was backed by a 14-piece band. The show's host Jo Whiley said that "people did cry". She referred to it as "the most famous cover" (from her show), stating that it is "always in demand and developed a life of its own". The day after Lewis's version appeared on the Live Lounge, it was requested over 8,000 times in the first 2 minutes of The Chris Moyles Show. As a result, her version was added to Radio 1's A List. Due to its popularity, Lewis recorded a studio version of the song in September 2008 for the re-release of her album Spirit. It was made available digitally in the United Kingdom on 30 November 2008.

"Run" was expected to be released as a single following Lewis's performance on the British The X Factor, but the single did not appear on any online music stores. It was believed that Lewis's record label, Sony, wanted to shift the sales towards the reissue of Spirit, which did return the album to number one. A spokesman for Lewis reported that the song "has never been scheduled for release as a single", but due to "overwhelming public demand", Lewis' management and record label released it in the UK on 30 November. In the US, a radio edit of "Run" was released as a digital download on 16 December 2008.

=== Critical reception ===
Lewis's version of the song received critical acclaim, although Snow Patrol guitarist Nathan Connolly admitted in November 2008 that he still had not heard her version: "Nothing against her, but I don't know if I'm going to endorse it either. It is what it is." The following month, Snow Patrol frontman Gary Lightbody described Lewis's version of the song as "phenomenal". He told the Scottish newspaper The Daily Record:

She obviously studied the song and thought long and hard about how to interpret it. She's stripped it to its bare core. I think she sounds absolutely phenomenal. I'm not a big fan of shows like The X Factor, but when talent like this comes along, I can't slate it. She's going to be around in 20 years. She's the next Whitney. She takes my breath away.

Music Radar said that "The two versions couldn't be more different. Snow Patrol's rendering is dark and moody, while Leona Lewis's is big-time pop", and quoted Gary Lightbody as saying "That's what you want a song to do ... Different interpretations and meanings. Songs aren't monolithic, at least the good ones aren't. What Leona Lewis has done has touched hearts." Newsround highly praised Lewis' cover version, stating that "the full gospel choir and orchestra easily match Leona's powerful pipes – and remind listeners why the song made people cry when she first performed it on Radio 1's Live Lounge last year". "Run" received three stars out of five from Digital Spy, who said that Lewis "wrings every last drop of emotion out of Gary Lightbody's lyrics, channeling her inner Mariah for some almighty warbling at the crescendo". The Sentinel described the single as "so much better" than Snow Patrol's original song. "It's powerful, painful and the choir behind it takes it on to another level." Radio presenter James Daniels concurred, saying "Leona just takes it to a whole new level, which is a phrase I hate to use – but it's true".

Lewis's version of "Run" was featured in episodes of EastEnders, Doctors, the fourteenth episode of the first season of The Vampire Diaries titled Fool Me Once, and also featured in the ending scenes of Two Pints of Lager and a Packet of Crisps Season 8 (2009) and The Letters (2014).

=== Chart performance ===
The song reached number one on the Irish Singles Chart in its first week of release, due to download sales alone. "Run" remained on the top position the four weeks in total. On 7 December 2008, it entered the UK Singles Chart at number one, also on downloads alone, making it her 3rd number one. It had become the fastest-selling UK download ever after it sold 69,244 in just two days, a record it held until December 2009. By the end of the first week, download sales had reached 131,593, some 8,000 below the first week sales of "A Moment Like This". The single spent a second week at number one in the United Kingdom, before 2008's The X Factor winner Alexandra Burke charted with "Hallelujah". "Run" re-entered The Official UK Top 40 at 32 on 15 March 2009. As of January 2021, the song has shifted over 1.2 million copies and is certified x2 platinum in the UK.

"Run" became Lewis's fifth UK Top Five single; it follows "A Moment Like This" which peaked at number one in 2006 and "Bleeding Love" in 2007. In 2008, the double A-side "Better in Time"/"Footprints in the Sand" peaked at number two, while "Forgive Me" peaked at number five. As of December 2013, Lewis holds the record for British female solo artist with the most UK Top 5 singles, with eight. "Run" was certified x2 platinum by the British Phonographic Industry (BPI) and BRIT Certified in January 2021, denoting shipments of more than 1.2 million copies. According to the Official Charts Company, the song had sold 832,000 copies in the UK as of January 2014.

The single has reached number one in Austria, Portugal, Ireland and UK. Also, peaked at 45 at the year-end charts in the UK. On 8 October 2010 "Run" re-entered the German charts again, after having been performed by a 14-year-old contestant on Das Supertalent. It placed at number 9, its highest position so far. After another 4 weeks, the song reached an even higher position, jumping from number 27 to number 3. In March 2011, the single spent its 52nd week at number 49 on the German Singles Chart, making it her first single to be on that chart for one year or longer, and the 41st single in general to do so. The single was placed a total of 94 non-consecutive weeks on the German charts.

=== Music video ===
The music video for "Run" was filmed in South Africa and was directed by Jake Nava. Lewis herself described the setting of the video as "an enchanted, haunted forest. It's picking up on different elements of the song." The video starts out with Lewis alone on a dusty trail, seemingly lost. She enters a dark forest and appears to be stalked by the viewer. In the final chorus, Lewis draws in the sun and the forest literally lights up, matching the lyrics of the song.

=== Live performances ===
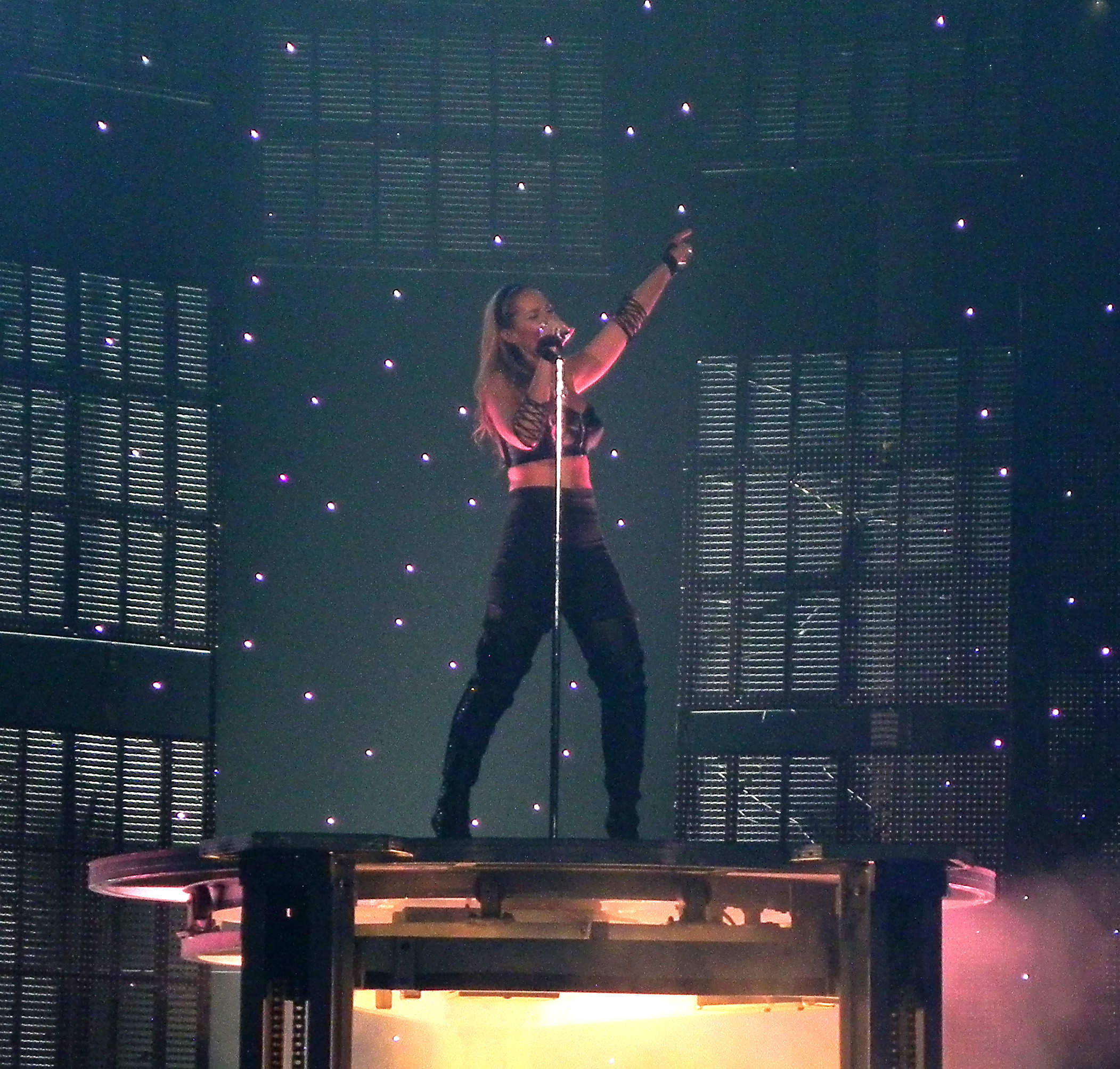
Lewis performing "Run" on The Labyrinth tour in 2010

Prior to Lewis recording her version of the song and releasing it as a single, she covered the song live on Jo Wiley's BBC Radio 1 show Live Lounge in November 2007. Wiley wrote on her website that although it was a "great" and "emotional" performance which caused members of the audience to cry, she felt that Snow Patrol's vocal could not be beaten. Lewis performed her studio recorded version of the song for the first time live on the fifth series of The X Factor (UK) on 15 November 2008. Lewis performed "Run" on Top of the Pops on 10 December 2008, and again the following day at the 80th Royal Variety Performance on 11 December 2008, which was held at the London Palladium. On 12 November 2009, Lewis was a special guest at Gary Barlow and Take That's Children in Need 2009 event called Children in Need Rocks the Royal Albert Hall. The singer performed "Run" and "Happy", the lead single from her second studio album, Echo (2009). She was a special guest performer at the eighth series semi-finals of German singing competition Popstars: Du & Ich in December 2009, where she sang the song. Lewis performed "Run" at the Rock in Rio festival held in Lisbon on 22 May 2010. The song was included as the second to last song on the set list of her debut concert tour, called The Labyrinth (2010). It was later included on the DVD release of the tour, The Labyrinth Tour: Live from the O2. Lewis performed the song in the encore section of the set list, along with "Bleeding Love".

On 18 October 2011, Lewis performed the song on the first live show of the second season of X Factor (Germany). The performance, accompanied by a full band a female choir, was described as being "lovely" by Robbie Daw for Idolator. As part of the promotion for her first EP called Hurt: The EP (2011), Lewis performed "Run" on the first-season finale of The X Factor (U.S.) on 22 December 2011, while a montage of highlights of the season were screened behind her. Season one judge Nicole Scherzinger was complimentary of Lewis's performance, saying "Leona blessed us with her beautiful voice." Lewis performed "Run" as the final song of her set at Radio 1's Hackney Weekend on 24 May 2012, and was joined on stage by the Hackney Community Choir. She opened with a cover of Diddy – Dirty Money's "Coming Home", who she was joined on stage with by Wretch 32, "Better in Time", "Come Alive", a new song which she premiered from the third studio album Glassheart (2012), "Bleeding Love" and "Collide". On 19 October 2012, Lewis performed the song on the Stand Up to Cancer telethon in the UK. Similar to her performance at Hackney Weekend, Lewis was accompanied on stage by The Big C Choir, which consists of people who have had or have cancer. She returned to the stage later on in the night to perform "Fingerprint", a track from Glassheart'. "Run" was performed as the seventeenth and final song on the set list of Lewis's 2013 tour called the Glassheart Tour.

=== Track listing ===
Digital download (United States)

1. "Run" (Single Mix) – 4:39

=== Credits and personnel ===
Recording

- Mixed at TwentyOne Studios, London.

Personnel

- Songwriting – Gary Lightbody, Jonathan Quinn, Mark McClelland, Nathan Connolly, Iain Archer
- Production – Steve Robson
- Engineer – Jonathan Shakhovskoy
- Mixing – Jeremy Wheatley
- String arrangement – Wil Malone
- Piano – Steve Robson
- Hammond – Paul Beard
- Bass – John Garrison
- Drums and percussion – Karl Brazil
- Guitar – Luke Potashnick
- Background vocals – Alani Gibbon, Beverley Brown, Carmen Reece, Chris Ballin, Jewell Elliott, Joy Malcolm, Ladonna Harley Peters, Lauraine Bristol, Lincoln Jean-Marie, Marvin Cotterell, Vula Malinger

Credits adapted from the liner notes of Run, Syco, Sony.

=== Charts ===
==== Weekly charts ====
Weekly chart performance for "Run"
Chart (2008–2010)	Peak position
Australia (ARIA)	78
Austria (Ö3 Austria Top 40)	1
Canada Hot 100 (Billboard)	13
Europe (European Hot 100 Singles)	6
Finland (Suomen virallinen lista)	7
Germany (GfK)	3
German Airplay (Official German Charts)	18
Ireland (IRMA)	1
Luxembourg Digital Songs (Billboard)	3
Netherlands (Dutch Top 40 Tipparade)	4
Netherlands (Single Top 100)	77
Portugal Digital Songs (Billboard)	1
Slovakia Airplay (ČNS IFPI)	34
Sweden (Sverigetopplistan)	13
Switzerland (Schweizer Hitparade)	2
UK Singles (Official Charts)	1
US Billboard Hot 100	81

==== Year-end charts ====
Year-end chart performance for "Run"
Chart (2008)	Position
UK Singles (OCC)	13
Chart (2009)	Position
Austria (Ö3 Austria Top 40)	22
UK Singles (OCC)	63
Switzerland (Schweizer Hitparade)	13
Chart (2010)	Position
Germany (Media Control GfK)	38
Switzerland (Schweizer Hitparade)	73
Chart (2011)	Position
Germany (Media Control GfK)	73

==== Decade-end charts ====
Decade-end chart performance for "Run"
Chart (2000–2009)	Position
UK Singles (OCC)	45

=== Certifications ===
Certifications and sales for "Run"
Region	Certification	Certified units/sales
Austria (IFPI Austria)	Gold	15,000^{*}
Germany (BVMI)	2× Platinum	600,000^{‡}
New Zealand (RMNZ)	Gold	15,000^{‡}
United Kingdom (BPI)	2× Platinum	1,200,000^{‡}
^{*} Sales figures based on certification alone.^{‡} Sales+streaming figures based on certification alone.

=== Release history ===
Release dates and formats for "Run"
Region	Date	Format(s)	Label(s)	Ref.
United Kingdom	30 November 2008	Digital download	Syco	
Germany	12 December 2008	CD	Sony Music	
United States	16 December 2008	Digital download	J	

== Other versions ==
- On 22 November 2008, a tribute act called "Ameritz" charted at No. 54 with a cover of this song. This prompted a spokesperson for Leona Lewis to declare that on 30 November, her version of the song would be released. This version moved up two places the next week, charting and peaking at No. 52.
- The song was covered by Jennylyn Mercado in 2010 and appears on the album Love Is....
- The song was covered by Tre Lux in 2006 and appears on the album A Strange Gathering.
- The song was covered by the pop classical group the Three Graces in Italian underneath the title "Si Accendera" on their 2008 self-titled debut album.
- The song was covered by Sarah Engels in 2011 and appears on the album Heartbeat.
- The song was covered by Katharine McPhee in the 12th episode of the TV series Smash, and subsequently released as a bonus track on the Target-exclusive deluxe edition of the Smash soundtrack.
- The song was covered by Damian McGinty in 2012 and appears on the album Damian McGinty.
- A classical cover of the song was released by the band Eklipse on their album A Night in Strings.
- Covered by Josh Groban and Sarah McLachlan in concert, and on Groban's 2018 album Bridges.
- Johnny Jaymez released the song retitled "Run (Light Up)" as a single in July 2018.
- The song was covered by Cold in 2019 and appears on the album The Things We Can't Stop.
- On 12 December 2019 a cover by the X-Factor Celebrities was released in aid of Shooting Star Children's Hospices.
- Sinéad O'Connor performed the song in April 2020 on Irish television station RTÉ.
