= Final Straw =

Studio album by Snow Patrol
- Released: 4 August 2003
- Recorded: February 2003
- Studio: Britannia Row
- Genres: Alternative rock; indie rock; power pop; post-Britpop
- Length: 44:00
- Labels: Fiction (UK); A&M (US)
- Producer: Jacknife Lee

Snow Patrol chronology
When It's All Over We Still Have to Clear Up (2001)	Final Straw (2003)	Eyes Open (2006)

Singles from Final Straw
- 1. "Spitting Games" Released: 15 September 2003; 2. "Run" Released: 26 February 2004; 3. "Chocolate" Released: 12 April 2004; 4. "Spitting Games (re-release)" Released: 12 July 2004; 5. "How to Be Dead" Released: 25 October 2004

Final Straw is the third studio album and major-label debut by Northern Irish alternative rock band Snow Patrol, released on 4 August 2003 in the United Kingdom and in 2004 in the United States. The album is notable for bringing the band their first mainstream success outside of their native countries of Northern Ireland and Scotland. In the 14 months following its release, a total of 5 singles were drawn from it. It is their first album to feature lead guitarist Nathan Connolly and their last with bassist Mark McClelland.

The album was re-released in the UK in 2004 with two extra tracks, before being exported to the US (without the bonus tracks). The album was also released on SACD and DualDisc with 5.1 Surround mixes.

A 20th anniversary edition was released on 4 August 2023, 20 years after the album's original release.

== Background ==
The band's A&R representative Jim Chancellor explained the reasons for choosing rock producer Jacknife Lee to oversee the record by saying, "I wanted a record for them that was bigger and bolder and a lot different than their previous records. I wanted them to make a more of a rock album than an indie record." Chancellor, Lee and the band chose fifteen songs to start working on out of an original pool of 24. Critical to the new direction was Lightbody's development into a more rounded songwriter. "They played us some songs which were not indie. There were a couple of pop songs and then "Run", which is an enormous emotional rollercoaster of a track," said Chancellor.

== Recording and composition ==
During the first couple of weeks in the studio the band found it quite difficult to adapt from an 'indie'-oriented sound to a more commercially viable pop rock sound. Producer Lee offered constructive suggestions about how to both simplify their songs and augment them with other sounds such as strings, and Snow Patrol proved very receptive to his advice. According to Chancellor, "Some bands tend to be more defensive about what goes on in the studio. Snow Patrol weren't. They were very much like, 'Yeah, we really want to be successful this time.'"

The lyrics, all written by Lightbody are about failing relationships and break-ups. They were inspired by his personal experiences. Quinn, his longtime friend, says that he knows who Lightbody sings about in those songs. Lightbody has said that his "finally learn[ing] to write a chorus" was the key to the album's success.

Guitarist Nathan Connolly joined the band during the recording sessions. He did not contribute much, as the whole album had already been demoed. He commented that he found it easy to start writing and sharing his ideas with the rest of the band, as he had a good relationship with the band before being a member. The album's music incorporates distorted guitar, feedback styles, and the vocals are gritty. The band's sound on the album was described as being a "cross between the sullen folk of Nick Drake and the more punchy rock moments of Simple Minds and the Pixies. Reviewing the album, Pitchfork described the performances as being based around "rigid, unwavering tempos that approximate dance music," created through looped sections of playing augmented with electronics. The first song, "How to Be Dead", introduces this sound with extensive use of drum machine programming.

== Release and reception ==
Professional ratings
Aggregate scores
Source	Rating
Metacritic	73/100
Review scores
Source	Rating
AllMusic	4/5 stars
Blender	4/5 stars
Chicago Sun-Times	3.5/4 stars
Entertainment Weekly	A
The Guardian	3/5 stars
Pitchfork	6.7/10
Q	4/5 stars
Rolling Stone	2/5 stars
Slant Magazine	3.5/5 stars
Uncut	4/5 stars

Final Straw received generally positive reviews from critics. According to Metacritic, the album received a weighted mean review score of 73 out of 100 based on 21 reviews, indicating "generally favorable reviews". Before repromotion of the album, sales reached 20,000 copies.

== Track listing ==
All lyrics are written by Gary Lightbody; all music is composed by Gary Lightbody, Nathan Connolly, Mark McClelland and Jonny Quinn except where noted

No.	Title	Length
1.	"How to Be Dead"	3:21
2.	"Wow"	4:02
3.	"Gleaming Auction"	2:04
4.	"Whatever's Left"	2:39
5.	"Spitting Games"	3:46
6.	"Chocolate"	3:02
7.	"Run" (Iain Archer, Lightbody, Connolly, McClelland, Quinn)	5:54
8.	"Grazed Knees"	2:55
9.	"Ways & Means" (Archer, Lightbody, Connolly, McClelland, Quinn)	4:47
10.	"Tiny Little Fractures"	2:28
11.	"Somewhere a Clock Is Ticking" (Archer, Lightbody, Connolly, McClelland, Quinn)	4:32
12.	"Same"	3:54

Japan / UK re-release bonus tracks
No.	Title	Length
13.	"We Can Run Away Now They're All Dead and Gone"	3:15
14.	"Half the Fun"	2:54

iTunes bonus tracks
No.	Title	Length
13.	"Post Punk Progression"	3:23
14.	"Steal"	2:45

DualDisc version bonus material
No.	Title	Length
13.	"Chocolate" (video)	3:43
14.	"Run" (video)	4:20
15.	"Spitting Games" (video)	3:52
16.	"Sessions@AOL: Interview"	6:14
17.	"Sessions@AOL: Run"	4:33

20th anniversary edition bonus tracks (disc 1)
No.	Title	Length
13.	"Steal"	2:45
14.	"Stronger Than Before" (demo)	3:22
15.	"By Heart" (demo)	3:11
16.	"We Can Run Away Now They're All Dead And Gone"	3:16
17.	"Tired"	2:34
18.	"Post Punk Progression"	3:21

20th anniversary edition bonus tracks (disc 2)
No.	Title	Length
1.	"Chocolate" (demo)	4:17
2.	"Run" (demo)	6:12
3.	"Gleaming Auction" (demo)	3:53
4.	"Somewhere A Clock Is Ticking" (demo)	5:17
5.	"Grazed Knees" (demo)	2:49
6.	"Spitting Games" (demo)	4:18
7.	"Wow" (Live at Somerset House)	3:48
8.	"Gleaming Auction" (Live at Somerset House)	2:08
9.	"Spitting Games" (Live at Somerset House)	4:09
10.	"How to Be Dead" (Live at Somerset House)	3:43
11.	"Chocolate" (Live at Somerset House)	3:10
12.	"Same" (Live at Somerset House)	4:02
13.	"Somewhere A Clock Is Ticking" (Live at Somerset House)	4:43
14.	"Ways & Means" (Live at Somerset House)	4:42
15.	"Run" (Live at Somerset House)	6:20
16.	"Post Punk Progression" (Live at Somerset House)	5:01
17.	"Tiny Little Fractures" (Live at Somerset House)	2:48

20th anniversary edition lp bonus tracks (side c)
No.	Title	Length
1.	"Steal"	2:45
2.	"Stronger Than Before" (demo)	3:22
3.	"By Heart" (demo)	3:11
4.	"We Can Run Away Now They're All Dead And Gone"	3:16
5.	"Tired"	2:34
6.	"Post Punk Progression"	3:21
7.	"Chocolate" (demo)	4:17

20th anniversary edition lp bonus tracks (side d)
No.	Title	Length
1.	"Run" (demo)	6:12
2.	"Gleaming Auction" (demo)	3:53
3.	"Somewhere A Clock Is Ticking" (demo)	5:17
4.	"Grazed Knees" (demo)	2:49
5.	"Spitting Games" (demo)	4:18

- The AOL sessions feature frontman Gary Lightbody & lead guitarist Nathan Connolly being interviewed, and performing an acoustic rendition of "Run".
- The dualdisc version does not include the UK bonus tracks.

== Personnel ==
Snow Patrol

- Gary Lightbody – vocals, guitar, glockenspiel, backing vocals, keyboards
- Nathan Connolly – guitar, backing vocals
- Mark McClelland – bass guitar, keyboards
- Jonny Quinn – drums

Other personnel

- Stephen Marcussen – mastering
- Louie Teran – mastering
- Iain Archer – background vocals (on track 12)
- Bruce White – viola
- James Banbury – piano, strings, cello
- Fiona McCapra – violin
- Ben Georgiades – engineer
- Dan Swift – engineer
- Jacknife Lee – producer, mixing
- Phil Tyreman – assistant engineer
- Ian Dowling – assistant engineer
- Mike Nelson – mixing
- Jeff McLaughlin – assistant
- Chris Lord-Alge – mixing

== Charts ==
Chart performance for Final Straw
Chart (2003)	Peak position
Dutch Albums (Album Top 100)	98
Irish Albums (IRMA)	9
Scottish Albums (Official Charts)	43
UK Albums (Official Charts)	3
US Billboard 200	91
US Heatseekers Albums (Billboard)	1

=== Year-end charts ===
Chart (2004)	Position
Irish Albums (IRMA)	5
UK Albums (OCC)	9

=== Decade-end charts ===
Chart (2000–09)	Position
UK Albums (OCC)	41

== Certifications and sales ==
Certifications for Final Straw
Region	Certification	Certified units/sales
Australia (ARIA)	Platinum	70,000^{^}
Ireland (IRMA)	6× Platinum	90,000^{^}
United Kingdom (BPI)	6× Platinum	1,849,296 (Note: Total sales figure as of July 2026)
United States (RIAA)	Gold	618,000
Summaries
Europe (IFPI)	2× Platinum	2,000,000^{*}
^{*} Sales figures based on certification alone.^{^} Shipments figures based on certification alone.
