= Spitting Games =

Single by Snow Patrol

from the album Final Straw
- Released: 15 September 2003
- Recorded: February 2003
- Studio: Britannia Row/The Diving Bell
- Genre: Alternative rock; power pop
- Length: 3:48
- Label: Black Lion; Fiction; Interscope (re-release)
- Songwriters: Gary Lightbody; Nathan Connolly; Mark McClelland; Jonny Quinn
- Producer: Jacknife Lee

Snow Patrol singles chronology
"One Night Is Not Enough" (2001)	"Spitting Games" (2003)	"Run" (2003)

Alternative covers
- Re-release cover

Snow Patrol singles chronology
"Chocolate" (2004)	""Spitting Games" (re-release)" (2004)	"How to Be Dead" (2004)

"Spitting Games" is a song by Northern Irish alternative rock band Snow Patrol, released on 15 September 2003 as the lead single of their third album, Final Straw (2003).

== Original release ==
Snow Patrol released the song during their first UK Tour during the Final Straw Tour. To mark the release, the band made a previously unheard song for a free download on their official site, titled "Half the Fun of It".

Snow Patrol were one of the acts chosen in AOL Music's "Breakers" in December 2003, a program to promote bands for months leading up to the release of their respective albums in the United States. During the time of the band's promotion, lead UK single "Spitting Games" was downloaded a million times, and was released as a stand-alone single in March 2004 in the week of the band's appearance at South by Southwest Festival.

=== Track listings ===
CD

1. "Spitting Games" – 3:48
2. "Steal" – 2:44
3. "Brave" – 4:12
4. "Spitting Games" (Video)

7" vinyl

1. "Spitting Games" – 3:48
2. "Steal" – 2:44

=== Reception ===
Music Week reviewed the single positively, calling it a classic indie song. It praised the "British chugging guitar" and "bittersweet melodies". IrishCentral called the song an alternative rock "masterpiece" and said it had made the band "cool".

Yahoo! Music's Simon Ward reviewed the single positively, awarding it 7 stars out of 10, though he criticized the song for being "an indie anthem of the kind Ash used to make ten years ago." He praised the song's "nagging 'do-doo harmonies and driving guitars" though said that it wasn't "going to rewrite rock history." He still felt "it's competent indie-pop that will doubtless signal skies full of water and bouncing moshpits at the rest of the summer's festivals. Which is, frankly, all that's asked of it."

== Re-release ==
"Spitting Games" was re-released on 12 July 2004, on both E-CD and 7" formats. The enhanced CD featured a cover of Beyoncé's "Crazy in Love", which was first performed on Zane Lowe's BBC Radio 1 show and another cover of Will Oldham's "New Partner", again from a Radio 1 Session for Steve Lamacq in 2002. The song made the A lists of BBC Radio 1, BBC Radio 2 and 95.8 Capital FM radio station of London. Due to heavy airplay by the radio stations, the single peaked at number six on the UK Airplay Chart. It helped the album Final Straw's sales, which reached number five, its highest chart placing after 23 weeks. The re-release of "Spitting Games" was the band's first charting single in the United States, and peaked at number 39 on the Billboard Hot Modern Rock Tracks chart on June 5, 2004.

=== Track listings ===
CD

1. "Spitting Games" – 3:48
2. "Crazy in Love" (BBC live version) – 4:25
3. "New Partner" (BBC live version) – 4:05
4. "Spitting Games" (video version 2)

7" vinyl

1. "Spitting Games" – 3:48
2. "Wow" (acoustic) – 3:09

Promo CD

1. "Spitting Games" (AAA Mix) – 3:28

== Charts ==
Chart (2003)	Peak position
Scotland Singles (OCC)	42
UK Singles (OCC)	54

Chart (2004)	Peak position
Ireland (IRMA)	41
Scotland Singles (OCC)	15
UK Singles (OCC)	23
UK Airplay (Official Charts Company)	6
US Modern Rock Tracks (Billboard)	39
