= Chocolate (Snow Patrol song) =

2004 single by Snow Patrol

Single by Snow Patrol

from the album Final Straw
- B-side: "Run" (remix); "One Night Is Not Enough" (live)
- Released: 12 April 2004
- Studio: Britannia Row
- Length: 3:02
- Label: Fiction; Polydor
- Songwriters: Gary Lightbody; Nathan Connolly; Mark McClelland; Jonny Quinn
- Producer: Jacknife Lee

Snow Patrol singles chronology
"Run" (2003)	"Chocolate" (2004)	"Spitting Games" (re-release) (2004)

"Chocolate" is a song by Northern Irish alternative rock band Snow Patrol, released on 12 April 2004 as the third single from their third album, Final Straw (2003). The music for the track was written by all four members of the band while the lyrics were written by lead vocalist Gary Lightbody. The song reached number 24 on the UK Singles Chart and number two on the US Billboard Triple-A chart.

== Music video ==
The video was directed by Marc Webb and was filmed in New York City. It shows scenes of panic and despair at what is apparently the "end of the world". The centerpiece or focal point of the action is an hourglass that is quickly running out. The implication here is that darkness and death will descend when the last grains of sand have fallen through the bottleneck to the bottom. After the lyrics finish, lead singer Gary Lightbody walks up and inverts the hourglass. The video fades out to the song's guitar riff repeating.

== Reception ==
Hot Press' reviewer Paul Nolan reviewed the single negatively. He wrote the song was true to its title, as it was "warm" and "anthemic", making comparisons to bands like Coldplay and Starsailor. He did not feel it was strong enough to match up to "Starfighter Pilot", which he called "a prime-time Snow Patrol number". He criticised the record company's approach, writing that the release was an attempt to capitalize on the success on the previous single "Run", Snow Patrol's breakthrough single.

== Track listings ==
- CD
1. "Chocolate" (video)
2. "Run" (Jackknife Lee remix) – 7:28
3. "One Night Is Not Enough" (live at the Liquid Rooms) – 4:19
- 7-inch
1. "Chocolate" – 3:09
2. "Run" (Jackknife Lee remix) – 7:28

== Charts ==
=== Weekly charts ===
Weekly chart performance for "Chocolate"
Chart (2004–2005)	Peak position
Ireland (IRMA)	40
Netherlands (Single Top 100)	34
Scotland Singles (Official Charts)	15
UK Singles (Official Charts)	34
US Adult Alternative Airplay (Billboard)	2
US Alternative Airplay (Billboard)	40

=== Year-end charts ===
Year-end chart performance for "Chocolate"
Chart (2005)	Position
US Triple-A (Billboard)	4

== Certifications ==
Certifications for "Chocolate"
Region	Certification	Certified units/sales
United Kingdom (BPI)	Silver	200,000^{‡}
^{‡} Sales+streaming figures based on certification alone.

== Release history ==
Release dates and formats for "Chocolate"
Region	Date	Format(s)	Label(s)	Ref.
United Kingdom	12 April 2004	7-inch vinyl; CD	Fiction; Polydor	
United States	24 January 2005	Alternative; triple A radio	A&M; Fiction; Polydor	
