= The Stables =

Music venue in Wavendon, Milton Keynes

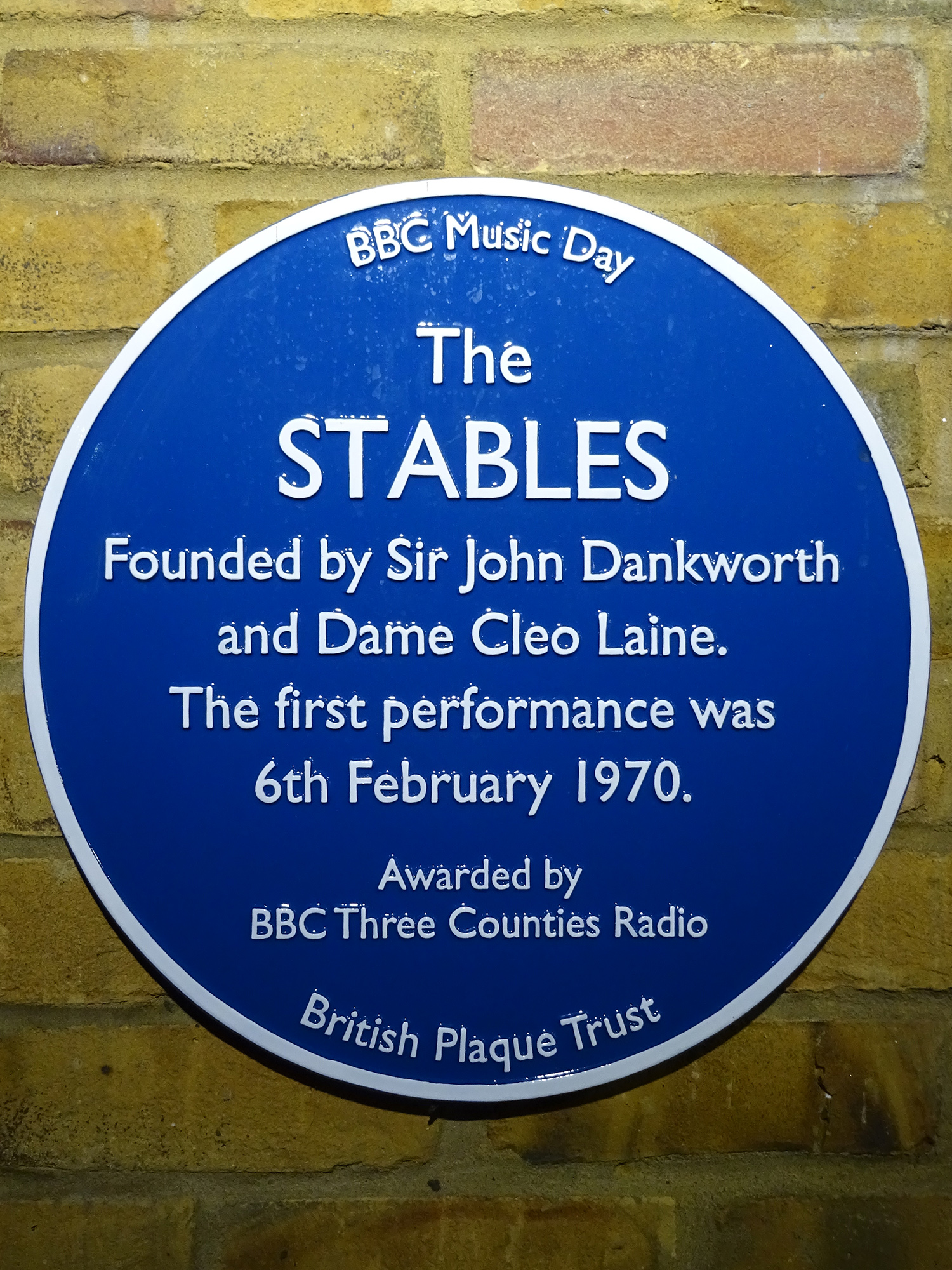
- Blue plaque erected by BBC Music and British Plaque Trust on 15 June 2017 as part of the BBC Music Day 2017 series.
- Interactive map of area around The Stables
- Address: Stockwell Lane, Wavendon; Milton Keynes, Buckinghamshire, England; United Kingdom
- Coordinates: 52.0274°N 0.676°W
- Owner: Wavendon Allmusic Plan Ltd
- Capacity: 398 (Jim Marshall Auditorium)
- Type: Music

Construction
- Opened: 1970
- Rebuilt: 2000
- Years active: 51
- Architect: Sansome Hall

Website
- stables.org

The Stables (also known as the Stables Theatre) is a music venue situated in Wavendon, a small village in south-east Milton Keynes. The Stables hosts over 400 concerts and around 250 education events a year including the National Youth Music Camps which take place over the summer.

== History ==
The Stables was founded by John Dankworth and Cleo Laine in 1970 in the former stables block in the grounds of their home. It was an immediate success with 47 concerts given in the first year. It now presents over 400 concerts and around 250 education events in its two spaces: the 400 seat Jim Marshall Auditorium and Stage 2, the 80-seat studio space. On 6 February 2010, it celebrated its 40th anniversary with a gala concert which was tinged with sadness because of the death earlier in the day of Sir John Dankworth. The venue was completely rebuilt in 2000, with the new foyer following the plan of the original theatre, with a subsequent development in 2007 to create Stage 2.

The Stables has hosted internationally renowned performers including Dave Brubeck, Amy Winehouse, Joan Armatrading, Courtney Pine, Janis Ian, Craig David, Beverley Knight, 10cc, Uriah Heep, Jamie Cullum, Bill Wyman, Cerys Matthews, Gregory Porter, Nigel Kennedy, Nils Lofgren, Steve Hackett, Sheku and Isata Kanneh-Mason, James Galway, Beth Neilsen Chapman and Curtis Stigers, Steve Harley (both with Cockney Rebel and his 2-5 piece acoustic sets).

It has hosted many live broadcasts including BBC Radio 2's Live from the Stables series, BBC Radio 3 recitals and recordings for CD and DVD releases including Never the Bride. The Stables commissioned the Harbour of Songs album, produced by Adrian McNally of The Unthanks and released on Proper Records in July 2012.

The Stables' learning and participation programme features workshops, masterclasses and residential courses.

Alumni from the National Youth Music Camps, founded by Avril Dankworth, include Guy Chambers, Dominic Miller, Quentin Collins and Thom Yorke.

== Organisation structure ==
The Stables is owned by Wavendon Allmusic Plan Ltd (WAP), a private company limited by guarantee and a registered charity (no 261645) which aims to engage the widest range of people with music in all its diversity. It is managed by a board of trustees which is responsible for policy and strategic direction. Two wholly owned subsidiary companies, The Stables Theatre (registered charity no 1178665), and The Stables Trading Ltd (currently dormant), carry out the operational activities of the company.

Dame Cleo Laine was the Honorary Life President and Dame Evelyn Glennie Honorary Patron. Monica Ferguson is the Chief Executive and Artistic Director.

The Stables is supported by around 250 volunteers and provides training and apprenticeships.

== IF: Milton Keynes International Festival ==
The Stables also produces IF: Milton Keynes International Festival, a multi-arts festival that engages people with music and sound in surprising ways in unusual spaces and places. The biennial festival, founded in 2010, runs for 10 days in July across central Milton Keynes.
