= Gary Lightbody =

Northern Irish musician (born 1976)

Gary Lightbody OBE
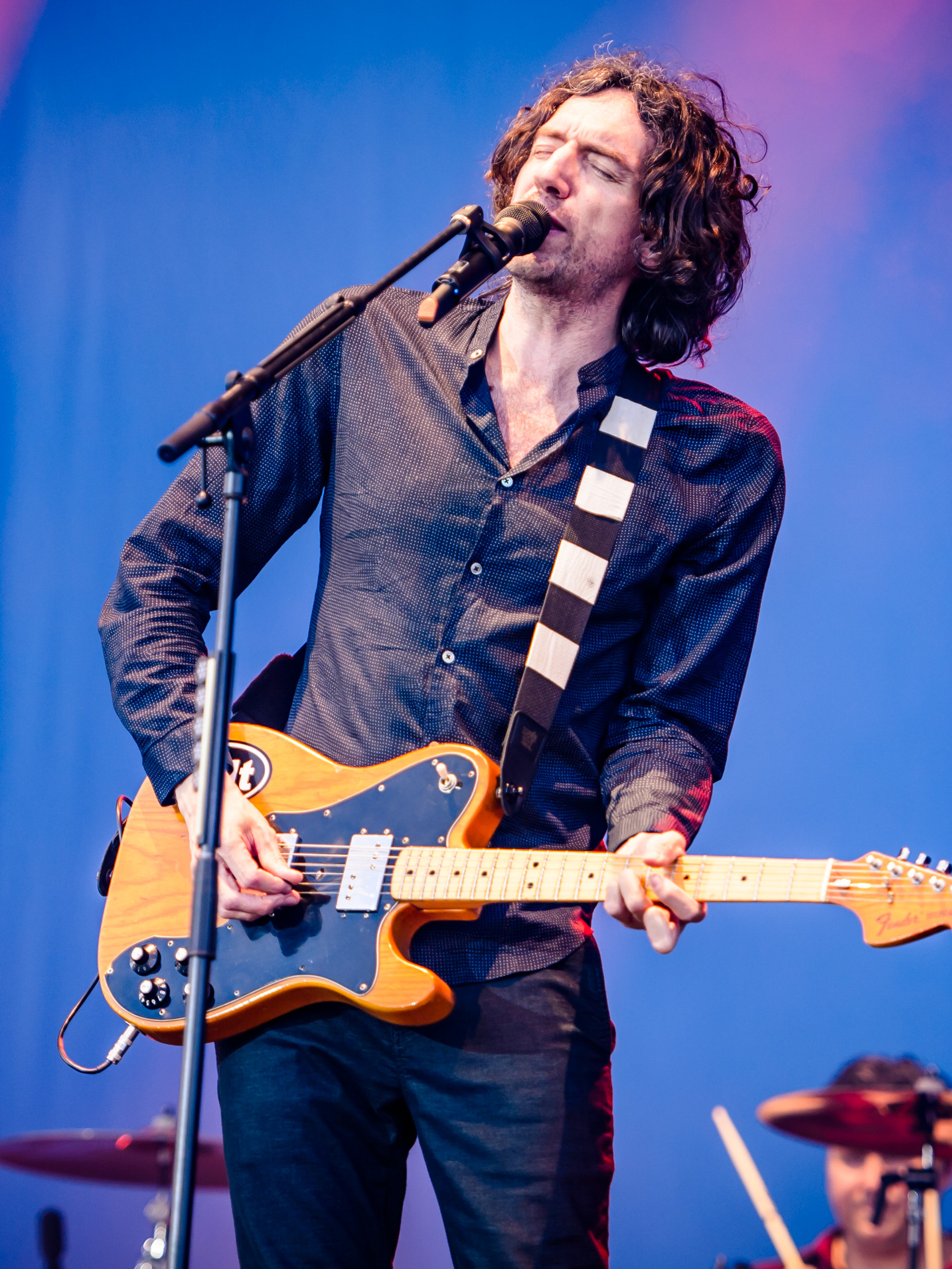
- Lightbody at Rock im Park 2018

Background information
- Born: Gareth John Lightbody; 15 June 1976 (age 50); Bangor, County Down, Northern Ireland
- Genres: Alternative rock; power pop; indie rock
- Occupations: Singer; songwriter; musician
- Instruments: Vocals; guitar
- Years active: 1994–present
- Member of: Snow Patrol; Tired Pony; Listen... Tanks!; The Reindeer Section

Gareth John Lightbody OBE (born 15 June 1976) is a musician from Northern Ireland. He is the lead singer and rhythm guitarist of the alternative rock band Snow Patrol. He also founded the musical supergroups the Reindeer Section and Tired Pony.

== Early life and education ==
Gareth John Lightbody was born in Bangor, County Down, Northern Ireland, to Lynne (née Wray) and Jack Lightbody. Jack Lightbody has been an independent business owner and has roots in Rosemount, Derry. Gary Lightbody has one sister, Sarah. He attended Rathmore Primary School, Rockport School and Campbell College, where he was first introduced to the writings of Seamus Heaney which inspired him to write his own poetry and songs.

In 1994, Lightbody left home for Scotland to study English literature at the University of Dundee, where he was a keen hockey player, often being dragged from his bed on a Saturday morning to play matches.

== Musical career ==
=== Snow Patrol ===
Lightbody formed a band with Mark McClelland and drummer Michael Morrison in 1994, called Shrug. Morrison left the band later, and the band were forced to change the name to Polarbear, as another band had claimed the name. In the band's first seven years of existence, they added drummer Jonny Quinn, released two albums (Songs for Polarbears, and When It's All Over We Still Have to Clear Up), and toured with bands such as Levellers, Ash and Travis. The band stayed in Glasgow during the recording of the first two albums. Lightbody used to hold a job at the Nice n Sleazy's Bar in Sauchiehall Street. Today, Lightbody owns a small place in Glasgow and says he will never leave the country behind, though he resides in Belfast. He feels an attachment to the place, as it gave him his first taste of success.

In the early days, Lightbody used to drink very heavily, and in his words, was "irrational, erratic, neurotic". He had become frustrated by Snow Patrol's lack of financial success and felt lost and aimless. He started cursing at the audience and demolishing the band's equipment. He found himself breaking guitars they could not afford. This phase ran for two years. He later gave up drinking and now does it "for fun" and credits his bandmates for the turnaround. The song "Disaster Button" (A Hundred Million Suns) deals with this topic. Though a musician, he cannot read music and has said that he "guesses" his way through chords. He has a baritone vocal range.

=== DJing ===
When at the University of Dundee, Lightbody met Nick DeCosemo, a fellow student, and the two became friends. DeCosemo also moved in Lightbody's Springfield apartment when he moved out of his parents' house. Nick had formed a club night called The Spaceship at the Tay Hotel. Along with Lightbody, friends Roy Kerr, Tom Simpson, and Anu Pillai also used to DJ there. They mixed up various styles of music as house, rock, and hip hop. They gained a loyal following and socialised together for about two years.

Lightbody later co-wrote "What Are You Waiting For" on the album Strangest Things, with Anu Pillai for Freeform Five. "What Are You Waiting For" was written before Snow Patrol released Final Straw, during a time when Lightbody was staying over at the band's place for a few days. Pillai had to literally drag a hungover Lightbody to the studio.

Lightbody has filled in for DJ Zane Lowe on his BBC radio show on one occasion during the 2007 takeovers. He was subsequently voted the best fill-in DJ amongst them by the listeners. He has compiled two DJ mix albums, one in The Trip series: The Trip: Created by Snow Patrol, and another with bandmate Tom Simpson, called Late Night Tales: Snow Patrol on the Late Night Tales series.

=== Other projects ===
In addition to his work with Snow Patrol and DJing, Lightbody has contributed to other projects and works. He made a cameo appearance in the Game of Thrones episode, "Walk of Punishment", playing a Bolton soldier who begins singing, "The Bear and the Maiden Fair".

==== Writing ====
Lightbody writes for various music magazines and newspapers like Q magazine and previously wrote for The Irish Times music section as guest-editor. As an impassioned music fan and DJ, he recommends in his essays albums and artists of different and wide-ranging genres of music.

In May 2009, Lightbody commenced writing his music column, Gary Lightbody's Band of the Week, in the magazine Q The Music.com.

In 2011, he wrote as an essayist for The Huffington Post.

==== Other musical projects ====
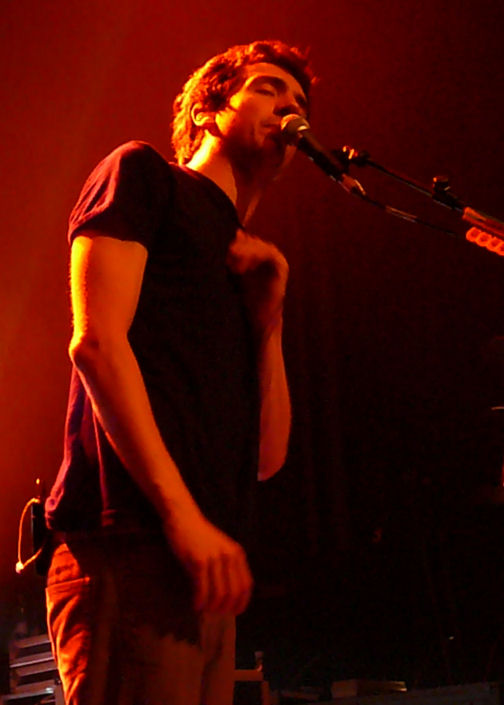
Lightbody performing live at Vega in Copenhagen in 2006

As a songwriter/bandleader, Lightbody has written songs and lyrics for a wide variety of artists and genres. In 2000, he formed the Scottish supergroup the Reindeer Section, comprising 47 musicians from 20 different bands, including members of bands like Belle & Sebastian, Mogwai, Idlewild, Teenage Fanclub, Arab Strap and other musicians. The group released Y'All Get Scared Now, Ya Hear! in 2001 and Son of Evil Reindeer in 2002.

2000–2002

- In addition to work on Snow Patrol and side project material, Lightbody lent his voice to the band Mogwai (one track on Rock Action).
- In 2001, he contributed to British breakbeat/electronica musician Cut La Roc's song "Fallen".

2005–2006

- In 2005, Lightbody was included in another musical collective, the Cake Sale, formed by Brian Crosby to raise funds and awareness for Ireland's Make Trade Fair campaign. He partnered with Lisa Hannigan to perform "Some Surprise", a song written by Bell X1's Paul Noonan. The song reached No. 5 on Irish charts as a radio–single release.
- He contributed vocals to the Freelance Hellraisers Waiting for Clearance debut album in 2006 and for UK producer Kidda's debut album Going Up.

2007–2008

- Lightbody was credited as songwriter for the track "Just Say Yes" for Nicole Scherzinger's debut solo album Her Name Is Nicole but due to the album being shelved the single was re-recorded by Pussycat Dolls and remains unreleased by Scherzinger. In 2009 Gary Lightbody announced in an interview that Snow Patrol would be releasing "Just Say Yes" as the first single from their Up to Now compilation record.
- In 2007, he lent his voice to British house musician and DJ Cut La Roc's track "Mishka" on his album Larger Than Life which is yet to be released.

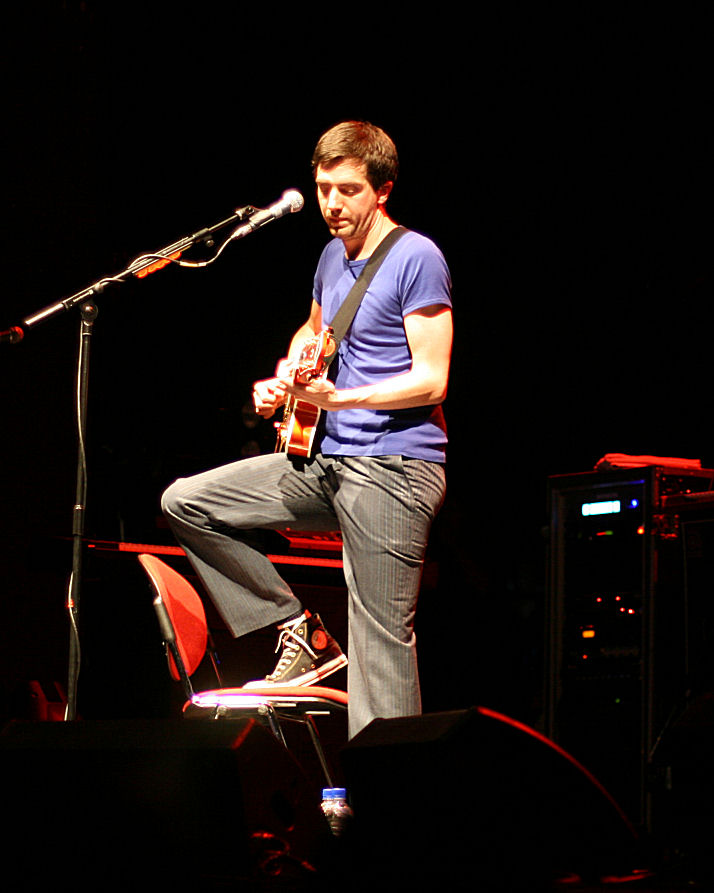
Lightbody in 2008, Bloomsbury Theatre in London

2008–2009

- In 2009, Lightbody announced that he had begun work on two solo side projects, a country group Tired Pony and an avant-garde group with Snow Patrol producer Jacknife Lee: Listen... Tanks!.
- August/September 2009: Lightbody joined with bandmates Johnny Quinn and Nathan Connolly to form Polar Music, a publishing music company "run by artists for artists" in co-operation with Universal Music Group and which will be administered by Kobalt Music in London. Polar Music's debut signing is artist Johnny McDaid from Northern Ireland who is writing with German electronica/trance DJ Paul van Dyk for an album due in 2010.

2010

- In January, Lightbody recorded in Portland, Oregon the debut album of his side project Tired Pony, with title The Place We Ran From. The album's release was announced for 12 July 2010. This new supergroup he founded includes Jacknife Lee as producer and musicians like R.E.M.'s guitarist/co-founder Peter Buck, Editors singer Tom Smith, singer and songwriter Iain Archer, Belle & Sebastian's drummer Richard Colburn, the Young Fresh Fellows and the Minus 5 singer Scott McCaughey, She & Him singer Zooey Deschanel, Snow Patrol's touring member guitarist Troy Stewart and guitarist M. Ward.
- Lightbody and producer Jacknife Lee contributed to the original score for the Irish film My Brothers, which appeared in the 2010 Tribeca Film Festival.
- Lightbody lent his songwriting and vocal talents to "Mishka", a collaboration with Cut La Roc, released on La Roc's 2010 album, Larger Than Life.
- Collaboration with former Kinks singer Ray Davies on Davies' album See My Friends as song "Tired of Waiting for You".

2012

- Featured on the track "The Last Time" on Taylor Swift's 2012 album Red.
- Performs with Ed Sheeran at the iTunes Festival singing a duet of "Chasing Cars".

2013

- Along with Johnny McDaid, performs at the Derry City of Culture Sons and Daughters concert, plays a three-song acoustic set singing "Run", "Just Say Yes" (the festival's anthem) and "Chasing Cars".
- Appears in a cameo in the Game of Thrones episode "Walk of Punishment"
- Appeared on The X Factor UK Season 10 in a duet with Taylor Swift. They sang "The Last Time" to promote it as a UK single on 3 November 2013.

2015

- Together with Johnny McDaid from Snow Patrol he composed several songs and the music for the film A Patch of Fog

2017

- Together with Johnny McDaid from Snow Patrol he composed the music played during the credit of the film Gifted.

2021

- Featured on the track "The Last Time (Taylor's Version)" on Taylor Swift's 2021 second re-recorded album Red (Taylor's Version).

== Musicianship ==
=== Influences ===
Growing up, Lightbody listened to artists like Super Furry Animals, Quincy Jones, Kool & the Gang, and Michael Jackson. He subsequently got into hard rock bands AC/DC and Kiss as a teen, and then alternative acts like Sebadoh, Mudhoney, Pixies and Pavement.

As a boy, he dreamed of becoming "the biggest rock star on the planet" like Bono, but he was never "cool".

=== Songwriting ===
Lightbody started writing songs at the age of 15, in a little room under the kitchen of the family's house. He had few guitar lessons where he learned the basics of the instrument but did not continue them, as he felt that one should not know any instrument "inside-out". He preferred to invent rather than use a formula. Today, he is not too fond of his earliest songs and thinks they "sucked". His songwriting style is mostly simple and basic, and he acknowledges that, saying he "[never] advanced past rudimentary". He feels the best way to write an honest song is to be simple, and that trying to complicate matters distorts the intended message. He believes the band has always tried to keep things as "simple and pure" as possible and has written from the heart. One of Lightbody's major inspirations to begin writing was notable Irish poet Seamus Heaney; which is alluded to on the B-side track on Snow Patrol's "The Planets Bend Between Us" single, named 'Reading Heaney To Me'. It also refers extensively to Heaney's poems throughout the lyrics.

Lightbody's lyrics typically deal with the topic of love. Although he considers himself a political person and has tried writing songs with such themes, he eventually abandoned his efforts as he found all of them awkward. Lightbody has said that all of the songs from the first two albums; Songs for Polarbears and When It's All Over We Still Have to Clear Up were written from personal experience. His lyrics often criticise himself or are self-deprecatory. He has cited "Chocolate" as an example, which he wrote after cheating on his girlfriend. He also considers writing a sort of "therapy" for himself.

Lightbody's songwriting has earned him much praise. In October 2009, he revealed that a certain "public figure", whom he wanted to remain nameless, told him that the band had written songs that were standards in today's world, and that Snow Patrol songs had become a part of the public consciousness. He compared their work to that of artists like Frank Sinatra and the Beatles. Lightbody realises this and cites performances of their songs on reality TV shows as an example.

=== Views on music industry ===
Lightbody has held the view that Snow Patrol may have had an easier time succeeding in the music industry than a band forming at the present time and attempting to become successful, given the changed state of the music industry, specifically how music is obtained by consumers. He questions the public's motive to buy the songs which they have already listened to, and blames Myspace for it.

Of Snow Patrol, Lightbody has said that all albums they managed to sell in the early days were from touring, as there were no unauthorized copies of their music available then. He believes if the current state of the industry continues, it would become impossible for bands starting out to become full-time. Despite this, he observes that the band might not have survived if they had been successful early in their career, as they would have subsequently taken that success for granted.

== Personal life ==
Lightbody is a supporter of Manchester United and has been known to support both the Republic of Ireland and Northern Ireland national football teams. This is supported by the song "Lifening", in which he sings the lyrics "Ireland in the World Cup, either North or South".

He is a fan of the X-Men, particularly Wolverine, and owns a stack of comics. He bought several comics as a child and has some that he has never opened, hoping they would become rare collectibles someday; in a later interview, he light-heartedly mentioned that they could earn him a small pension. He considers himself a "comics freak".

Despite having written several romantic songs, Lightbody has been reported as having had trouble talking to women.

Lightbody quit drinking alcohol in 2016 before recording the album Wildness.

=== Philanthropy ===
Lightbody has been involved in numerous causes, mostly related to music and football. He is on the board of directors of the Oh Yeah Music Centre in Northern Ireland, a project set up to give young artists a place where they can share ideas and kick-start their music careers, as often is the trend of talent leaving the country from lack of appraisal. He supported young bands from Northern Ireland and involved them as support bands to shows of Snow Patrol's UK & Ireland Arena Tour of February–March 2009.

Lightbody is one of the supporting voices for the growing music scene in Belfast in Northern Ireland and once stated in an interview to have grown up as an "Indie rock kid" inspired to become a musician through influences of artists and acts such as Kurt Cobain, Super Furry Animals, and Sebadoh.

In July 2019, Lightbody set up the Lightbody Foundation to support charities across Northern Ireland and the rest of the world. In May 2020, he donated £50,000 to support musicians in Northern Ireland struggling in the aftermath of the coronavirus. Two months later, the foundation donated around $90,000 to nine different charities in America.

Lightbody has worked with the aid organisation Save the Children in Uganda, an experience on which he has written in New Statesman. He has also been involved in raising awareness of depression, a condition that he himself has struggled with.

== Discography ==
=== Singles ===
==== As featured artist ====
List of singles, showing selected chart positions, certifications, and associated albums
Title	Year	Peak chart positions					Album
Title	Year	US	CAN	IRE	UK	WW	Album
"The Last Time" (Taylor Swift featuring Gary Lightbody of Snow Patrol)	2012	— (Note: "The Last Time" did not enter the Billboard Hot 100, but it peaked at number 3 on the Bubbling Under Hot 100 chart.)	73	15	25	—	Red
"The Last Time (Taylor's Version)" (Taylor Swift featuring Gary Lightbody of Snow Patrol)	2021	66	53	—	—	61	Red (Taylor's Version)
"—" denotes a song that did not chart or was not released in that territory.

== Recognition ==
=== Honours ===
In July 2012, Lightbody received an Honorary Doctorate in Letters from the University of Ulster at a ceremony in the Millennium Forum, Derry. See also Snow Patrol Awards.

Lightbody was honoured in November 2018 at the Northern Ireland Music Prize with an award for outstanding contribution to music.

Lightbody was appointed Officer of the Order of the British Empire (OBE) in the 2020 New Year Honours for services to music and to charity in Northern Ireland.

Lightbody was awarded the Freedom of the Borough of Ards and North Down on 30 August 2022.

=== Awards and accolades ===
Year	Publication	Entity	Rank
2005	Scotland on Sunday	The Eligibles	4
2006	Scotland on Sunday	The Eligibles	1
2007	Scotland on Sunday	The Eligibles	Top 10
2006	Daily Record	100 Hottest Scots	5
2007	Daily Record	100 Hottest Scots	9
2009	Social and Personal	Sexiest Irishmen	96
2009	Q	Artists of the Century	*
2019	PPL	Most played song on UK Radio (Chasing Cars)	*

== Musical equipment ==
=== Guitars ===
- Lightbody's main guitar is a Fender '72 Telecaster Deluxe reissue in black. His guitars are known for the 'CELT' sticker on them.
- Gretsch 6120 New Nashville – orange (seen during a 2008 performance on Later... with Jools Holland)
- Gretsch G6122-II Chet Atkins Country Gentleman (seen during the Snow Patrol European May – July 2010 tour)
- Gibson SG – black with white pickguard
- Fender Telecaster '72 Thinline Reissue – blonde
- Fender Telecaster (c)'77 Deluxe – blonde
- Fender Telecaster Standard – USA model in yellow
- Fender Telecaster Standard – black (seen in music video for "Spitting Games")
- Gibson Les Paul Deluxe – black (also bears the CELT sticker)
- Guild Acoustic
- Lowden Acoustic

=== Amplifiers ===
- Diamond Decada Amp Head with Decada 4x12 Cab (uses two of the same)
- Mesa/Boogie Dual Rectifier Solo Heads with Rectifier 4x12 Cabs
- Marshall JCM800 2203 with JCM 1960A 4x12 Cab
- Marshall 3315 Transistor Amp (originally used by Nathan Connolly) with 1960TV 4x12 Cab
- Vox AC30 Custom Classic

=== Effects ===
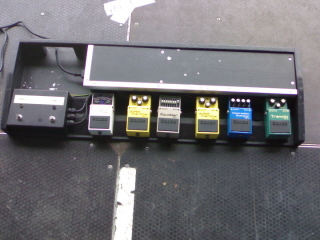
Lightbody's pedalboard

- BOSS TU-2 Tuner
- BOSS TR-2 Tremolo
- BOSS CS-3 Compression Sustainer
- BOSS SD-1 Super Overdrives (2)
- BOSS GE-7 Equalizer
- BOSS RE-20 Space Echo
- Boss DD6/7

=== Miscellaneous ===
- Picks: Dunlop Tortex Standard Orange .60mm
- Strings: Gauge .010
- Pickup preference: Neck Position. Amplifier EQ set quite bright for jangly tone
- Vocal mic: Shure Beta 58
