= Jonny Quinn =

Northern Irish musician (born 1972)

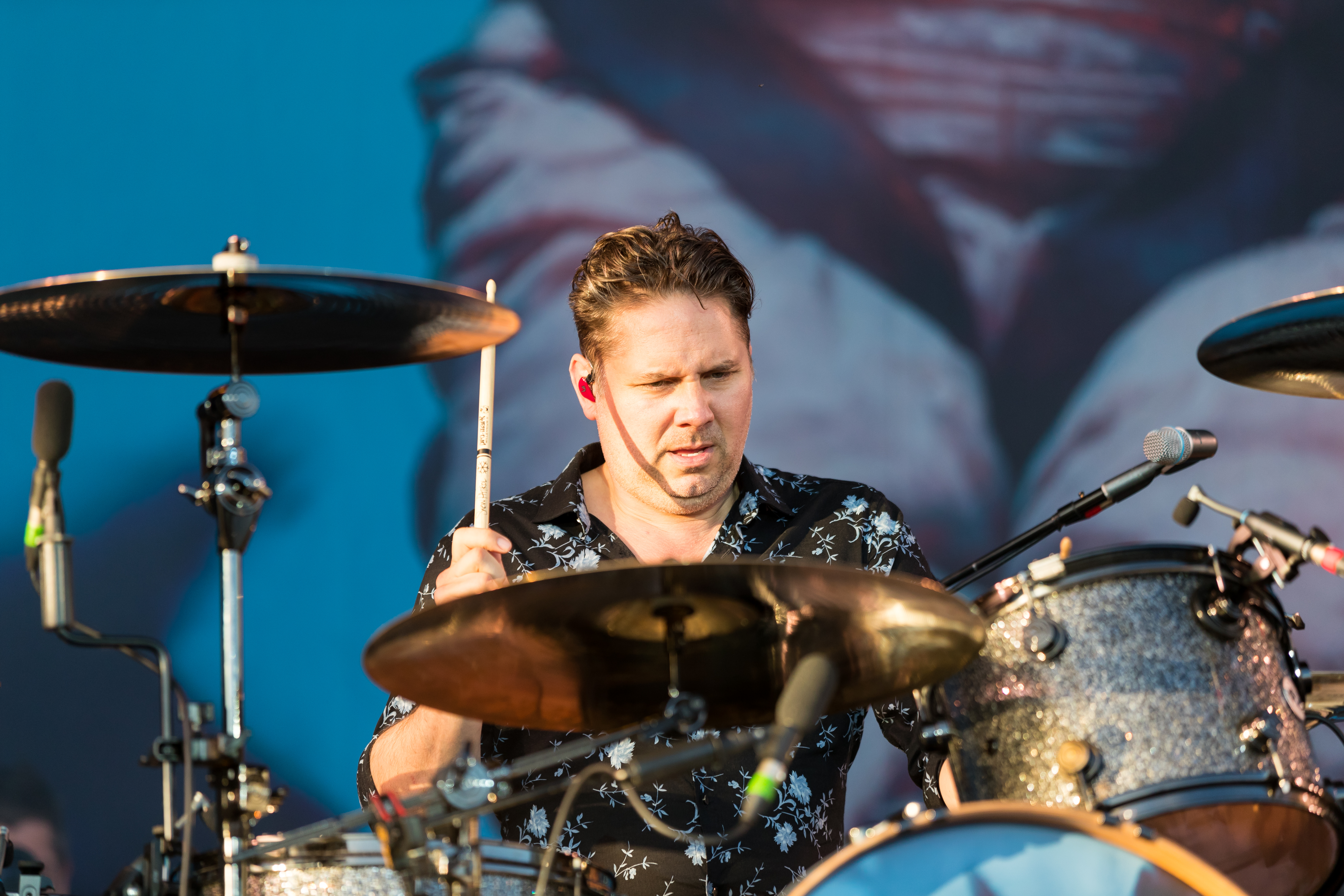
- Quinn in 2018

Background information
- Also known as: Jonny
- Born: Jonathan Graham Quinn; 26 February 1972 (age 54); Belfast, Northern Ireland
- Origin: Bangor, Northern Ireland
- Genres: Alternative rock, indie rock
- Occupations: Drummer, musician
- Instruments: Drums, percussion
- Years active: 1991–present
- Labels: Fiction/Interscope, Good Vibrations
- Formerly of: Snow Patrol

Jonathan Graham Quinn (born 26 February 1972) is a Northern Irish musician, best known as the former drummer for alternative rock band Snow Patrol, and was previously a member of bands like The Mighty Fall, The New Brontes and Disraeli Gears. As drummer for Snow Patrol, he has played on all releases up until he left the band in 2023. He is married to industrial designer Mariane Quinn (née Røkke).

== Biography ==
He attended Rockport School near Holywood and Campbell College Belfast both of which singer Gary Lightbody attended. He once used to work in the music store for Good Vibrations, the record label that first signed The Undertones. In the early 1990s, he was a member of Mighty Fall, in which he had a bandmate in Iain Archer. He was also a member of The New Brontes. In the summer of 1992, he became a member of Disraeli Gears, which was formed by Iain's brother Paul. In 1995, he completed a BTEC Diploma in Performing Arts. In October 1996, he started a live music venue with Brendan McCauley, called The Crescent Arts Centre. Disraeli Gears played regular shows at the venue throughout the rest of the year. In 1997, they recorded their first studio album, Pure Groove.

He has been with Snow Patrol since their first full-length release, Songs for Polarbears. During Snow Patrol's Eyes Open Tour, on 15 January 2007, Quinn broke a bone in his elbow in a snowboarding accident and was unable to play several shows of the tour. He asked Ex-Therapy? drummer and long-time friend of the band Graham Hopkins to fill in for him. Hopkins toured Europe, Australia, New Zealand and the United States for 3 months until Quinn had fully recovered. In the meantime, Snow Patrol were to play at the 2007 BRIT Awards. U2's Larry Mullen, Jr. volunteered to take on the duty but the band already had Hopkins. Quinn said he felt "honored" at the offer. He names Ginger Baker, Louie Bellson and Stewart Copeland among his influences.

In 2009, Quinn set up and launched the publishing company Polar Patrol Publishing. His first signing was Johnny McDaid who then went onto write with many artists including Ed Sheeran, Birdy and Robbie Williams. Jonny was also responsible for signing Belle & Sebastian to Polar Patrol in 2014.

In September 2023, Lightbody announced on Instagram that Quinn and Paul Wilson decided to leave Snow Patrol.

== Personal life ==
He is the nephew of actress Patricia Quinn and the brother of Bradley Quinn, Snow Patrol's longtime photographer. His cousin is Debbie Armstrong, wife of former Northern Ireland national football team, assistant manager Gerry Armstrong. Quinn had a habit of stage-diving, which resulted in many fractured limbs. After the band signed to Fiction/Interscope, he was asked to curb it, lest he break his arm.

He proposed to his longtime girlfriend, industrial designer Mariane Røkke at Snow Patrol's homecoming show at Ward Park in 2007. He wrote "Marry me Mariane" on his drum kit, which was shown on the screens beside the stage. They married in Mariane's hometown Oslo on 16 August 2008. Quinn's brother Bradley Quinn was the best man. Guests included the band, past Snow Patrol collaborator and bandmate Iain Archer and singer Declan O'Rourke. The couple went to Zanzibar for their honeymoon.

He lives in Crouch End, London with his wife and son, near former bandmate Nathan Connolly.

== Equipment ==
He is known to use DW drums, Zildjian cymbals and Pro-Mark sticks. He used Pearl drums in the past.

== Discography ==
with The Mighty Fall

1991 – "Kick It in the Head";

with Disraeli Gears

1995 – Sense EP
1997 – Pure Groove

with Snow Patrol

1998 – Songs for Polarbears
2001 – When It's All Over We Still Have to Clear Up
2003 – Final Straw
2006 – Eyes Open
2008 – A Hundred Million Suns
2009 – Up to Now
2011 – Fallen Empires
2013 – Greatest Hits
2018 – Wildness
