= Fallen Empires Tour =

2012 concert tour by Snow Patrol

- Tour by Snow Patrol
- Promotional poster for the tour
- Location: Asia; Australia; Europe; North America; South America
- Associated album: Fallen Empires
- Start date: 20 January 2012
- End date: 31 December 2012
- Legs: 10
- No. of shows: 117

Snow Patrol concert chronology
- Taking Back the Cities Tour (2008–2010); Fallen Empires Tour (2012); Wildness Tour (2019–2022)

The Fallen Empires Tour was a concert tour by Northern Irish alternative rock band Snow Patrol.

== Background ==
The tour was announced on September 20, 2011 with dates in Dublin and Belfast only. Tickets for these shows went on sale on September 22, 2011. These two shows sold out causing the band to add a further date in Dublin with two extra shows being announced for Belfast. The first continental Europe show were announced in October 2011 with dates across Germany. A show in Rotterdam was announced for March 1, this show sold out within 30 minutes of going on sale resulting in another show being added for the following night. Shows in Denmark and Sweden were announced on November 23. The band will also make to debut appearance in Dubai when they perform at the Atlantis Hotel Open Air Event alongside Calvin Harris on March 9. The band will also make their debut appearance in Oman, playing the InterContinental Gardens. It was also announced they would play a show at Dublin's Phoenix Park, they will co-headline this concert with Florence and the Machine.

It was announced that the band would return to Australian shores to perform two special acoustic shows in Sydney and Melbourne, they will perform an acoustic set with songs from Fallen Empires and classic hits such as Chasing Cars and Run. They are also set to return to North America for a short fourteen date tour in which they will co-headline with Noel Gallagher's High Flying Birds with Jake Bugg being the main support act. They will also play three headline shows as part of this leg of the tour

== Opening acts ==
- Rams' Pocket Radio (Europe, select dates)
- Ed Sheeran (North America, select dates)
- Rousseau (Oakland—May 5, Los Angeles)
- Gary Go (Dallas, Houston, Austin, Biloxi)
- Everything Everything (United Kingdom & Ireland)
- Admiral Fallow (Glasgow)
- A Plastic Rose (Belfast—January 25, London—February 11)
- Florence and the Machine (Co-Headlining Dublin—July 8)
- The Temper Trap (Dublin—July 8)
- Noel Gallagher's High Flying Birds (Leg 8—North America),(co-headlining)
- Jake Bugg (Leg 8—North America)
- Lissie (Leg 8—North America)

== Setlist ==
1. "Hands Open"
2. "Take Back the City"
3. "Crack the Shutters"
4. "This Isn't Everything You Are"
5. "Run"
6. "In the End"
7. "New York"
8. "Set the Fire to the Third Bar"
9. "Make This Go on Forever"
10. "Shut Your Eyes"
11. "Chasing Cars"
12. "Chocolate"
13. "Called Out in the Dark"
14. "Fallen Empires"
15. "Open Your Eyes"
16. "You're All I Have"

Encore

17. "Lifening"
18. "Just Say Yes"

Notes

- During the show in Belfast on January 24, Snow Patrol performed "You Could Be Happy", "Spitting Games" and "How to Be Dead".
- During the show in Glasgow on January 27, the band performed "In the End" and "You Could Be Happy".
- During the show in Glasgow on January 28, "Wow", "Ways & Means", "Same", "Grazed Knees", "Dark Roman Wine" and "The Finish Line" was performed.
- During the shows in Liverpool & Newcastle, "I'll Never Let Go", "In the End" & "You Could Be Happy" was performed.
- During the show in Berlin on June 29, "Dark Roman Wine" was performed.

== Tour dates ==
Date	City	Country	Venue
Europe
January 20, 2012	Dublin	Ireland	The O_{2}
January 21, 2012	Dublin	Ireland	The O_{2}
January 23, 2012	Belfast	Northern Ireland	Odyssey Arena
January 24, 2012	Belfast	Northern Ireland	Odyssey Arena
January 25, 2012	Belfast	Northern Ireland	Odyssey Arena
January 27, 2012	Glasgow	Scotland	Scottish Exhibition and Conference Centre
January 28, 2012	Glasgow	Scotland	Scottish Exhibition and Conference Centre
January 30, 2012	Aberdeen	Scotland	Press & Journal Arena
January 31, 2012	Liverpool	England	Echo Arena
February 1, 2012	Nottingham	England	Capital FM Arena Nottingham
February 3, 2012	Manchester	England	Manchester Arena
February 4, 2012	Birmingham	England	LG Arena
February 5, 2012	Newcastle	England	Metro Radio Arena
February 7, 2012	Sheffield	England	Motorpoint Arena Sheffield
February 8, 2012	Bournemouth	England	Windsor Hall
February 10, 2012	London	England	The O_{2} Arena
February 11, 2012	London	England	The O_{2} Arena
February 12, 2012	London	England	The O_{2} Arena
February 22, 2012	Copenhagen	Denmark	Falkoner Theatre
February 23, 2012	Stockholm	Sweden	Münchenbryggeriet
February 25, 2012	Berlin	Germany	Tempodrom
February 26, 2012	Düsseldorf	Germany	Mitsubishi Electric Halle
February 28, 2012	Frankfurt	Germany	Jahrhunderthalle
February 29, 2012	Antwerp	Belgium	Lotto Arena
March 1, 2012	Rotterdam	Netherlands	Rotterdam Ahoy
March 2, 2012	Rotterdam	Netherlands	Rotterdam Ahoy
March 4, 2012	Munich	Germany	Zenith Kulturhalle
March 5, 2012	Münchenstein	Switzerland	St. Jakobshalle
March 7, 2012	Paris	France	Zénith de Paris
Asia
March 9, 2012^{[A]}	Dubai	United Arab Emirates	Atlantis, The Palm Beach
March 11, 2012	Muscat	Oman	InterContinental Gardens
North America
March 29, 2012	Orlando	United States	Hard Rock Live
March 30, 2012	Miami Beach	United States	The Fillmore Miami Beach
March 31, 2012	St. Petersburg	United States	Jannus Live
April 2, 2012	Atlanta	United States	The Tabernacle
April 3, 2012	Nashville	United States	Ryman Auditorium
April 4, 2012	Cincinnati	United States	Bogart's
April 6, 2012	Washington, D.C.	United States	9:30 Club
April 7, 2012	Washington, D.C.	United States	9:30 Club
April 10, 2012	Philadelphia	United States	Electric Factory
April 12, 2012	Boston	United States	Orpheum Theatre
April 13, 2012	New York City	United States	Terminal 5
April 14, 2012	New York City	United States	Terminal 5
April 16, 2012	Montreal	Canada	Métropolis
April 17, 2012	Toronto	Canada	Massey Hall
April 18, 2012	Toronto	Canada	Massey Hall
April 20, 2012	Detroit	United States	The Fillmore Detroit
April 21, 2012	Chicago	United States	Aragon Ballroom
April 22, 2012	Indianapolis	United States	Egyptian Room
April 24, 2012	Kansas City	United States	Beaumont Club
April 25, 2012	Minneapolis	United States	State Theatre
April 27, 2012	Denver	United States	Fillmore Auditorium
April 28, 2012	Salt Lake City	United States	The Depot
April 30, 2012	Vancouver	Canada	Orpheum Theatre
May 1, 2012	Seattle	United States	Paramount Theatre
May 2, 2012	Portland	United States	McMenamins Crystal Ballroom
May 4, 2012	Oakland	United States	Fox Oakland Theatre
May 5, 2012	Oakland	United States	Fox Oakland Theatre
May 8, 2012	Los Angeles	United States	Hollywood Palladium
May 10, 2012	Pomona	United States	Pomona Fox Theater
May 11, 2012	Temecula	United States	Pechanga Showroom Theater
May 12, 2012	Paradise	United States	Boulevard Pool
May 14, 2012	Phoenix	United States	Comerica Theatre
May 16, 2012	Dallas	United States	South Side Music Hall
May 17, 2012	Austin	United States	Waller Creek Outdoor Amphitheatre
May 18, 2012	Houston	United States	Bayou Music Center
May 19, 2012	Biloxi	United States	Hard Rock Live
Europe
June 15, 2012^{[B]}	Seinäjoki	Finland	Törnävä Festival Park
June 17, 2012^{[C]}	Aarhus	Denmark	Ådalen
June 23, 2012^{[D]}	Roeser	Luxembourg	Herchesfeld
June 24, 2012	Hamburg	Germany	O_{2} World Hamburg
June 26, 2012	Vienna	Austria	Arena Wien
June 27, 2012^{[E]}	Sopron	Hungary	Lővér Kempingek
June 29, 2012	Berlin	Germany	Spandau Citadel
June 30, 2012^{[F]}	Nijmegen	Netherlands	Goffertpark
July 1, 2012^{[G]}	Werchter	Belgium	Werchter Festival Grounds
July 3, 2012^{[H]}	Dresden	Germany	Neustädter Elbufer
July 4, 2012	Cologne	Germany	Lanxess Arena
July 6, 2012^{[J]}	Perth and Kinross	Scotland	Balado
July 8, 2012	Dublin	Ireland	Phoenix Park
July 12, 2012^{[K]}	Bilbao	Spain	Kobetamendi
July 13, 2012^{[L]}	Oeiras	Portugal	Passeio Marítimo de Algés
July 15, 2012^{[M]}	Bern	Switzerland	The Gurten
Asia
July 17, 2012^{[N]}	Byblos	Lebanon	Byblos Seaside Amphitheater
August 4, 2012	Chek Lap Kok	Hong Kong	AWE Hall 10
August 6, 2012	Downtown Core	Singapore	Fort Canning Park
August 8, 2012	Quezon City	Philippines	Smart Araneta Coliseum
August 11, 2012^{[O]}	Incheon	South Korea	Gyeongin Ara Waterway Incheon Terminal
Europe
August 18, 2012^{[P]}	Weston-under-Lizard	England	Weston Park
August 19, 2012^{[P]}	Chelmsford	England	Hylands Park
Australia
September 30, 2012	Melbourne	Australia	Regent Theatre
October 1, 2012	Sydney	Australia	State Theatre
South America
October 5, 2012	Santiago	Chile	Teatro Caupolicán
October 7, 2012	Buenos Aires	Argentina	Luna Park
October 9, 2012	Rio de Janeiro	Brazil	Citibank Hall
October 10, 2012	São Paulo	Brazil	Credicard Hall
October 11, 2012	Belo Horizonte	Brazil	Chevrolet Hall
North America
October 14, 2012	Mexico City	Mexico	Autódromo Hermanos Rodríguez^{[Q]}
October 19, 2012	Valley Center	United States	Open Sky Theatre
October 20, 2012	Santa Barbara	United States	Santa Barbara Bowl
October 21, 2012	San Jose	United States	San Jose Civic Auditorium
October 23, 2012^{1}	Portland	United States	Arlene Schnitzer Concert Hall
October 24, 2012^{1}	Seattle	United States	WaMu Theater
October 25, 2012^{1}	Vancouver	Canada	Rogers Arena
October 27, 2012^{1}	Edmonton	Canada	Edmonton Expo Centre
October 28, 2012^{1}	Calgary	Canada	Stampede Corral
October 30, 2012^{1}	Winnipeg	Canada	Centennial Concert Hall
October 31, 2012^{1}	Saint Paul	United States	Roy Wilkins Auditorium
November 1, 2012^{1}	Kansas City	United States	Midland Theatre
November 3, 2012^{1}	Hammond	United States	The Venue
November 4, 2012^{1}	Louisville	United States	Palace Theatre
November 5, 2012^{1}	Nashville	United States	Ryman Auditorium
November 7, 2012^{1}	Grand Prairie	United States	Verizon Theatre at Grand Prairie
November 8, 2012^{1}	Austin	United States	Music Hall
November 9, 2012^{1}	Houston	United States	Bayou Music Center
Europe
23 December 2012^{[R]}	Belfast	Northern Ireland	Waterfront Hall

- 1 These shows mark the co-headlining dates with Noel Gallagher's High Flying Birds.

Festivals and other miscellaneous performances

- ^{A} This concert was a part of "Dubai Atlantis Open Air"
- ^{B} This concert is part of "Provinssirock"
- ^{C} This concert is part of the "NorthSide Festival"
- ^{D} This concert was part of "Rock A Field"
- ^{E} This concert was part of the "Volt Festival"
- ^{F} This concert was part of "Rockin' Park"
- ^{G} This concert is part of "Rock Werchter"
- ^{H} This concert is a part of "Filmnächte am Elbufer"
- ^{J} This concert is part of "T in the Park"
- ^{K} This concert is part of "Bilbao BBK Live"
- ^{L} This concert is part of "Optimus Alive!"
- ^{M} This concert is part of "Gurtenfestival"
- ^{N} This show is part of the Byblos International Festival.
- ^{O} This concert is a part of the "Pentaport Rock Festival"
- ^{P} These concerts are a part of the "V Festival"
- ^{Q} This concert is part of the Corona Capitol Festival
- ^{R} This concert is a Homecoming acoustic show. There will be 2 shows on this date.

Cancellations and rescheduled shows

July 17, 2012	Byblos, Lebanon	UNESCO Square	Moved to Byblos Seaside Amphitheater.

=== Box office score data ===
Venue	City	Tickets sold / available	Gross revenue
The O_{2}	Dublin	24,954 / 24,954 (100%)	$1,317,390
Odyssey Arena	Belfast	30,556 / 30,556 (100%)	$1,470,220
Manchester Arena	Manchester	15,929 / 16,258 (98%)	$802,981
The O_{2} Arena	London	45,455 / 48,338 (94%)	$2,504,380
Lotto Arena	Antwerp	7,307 / 7,347 (99%)	$359,048
Jannus Live	St. Petersburg	2,003 / 2,003 (100%)	$53,351
Ryman Auditorium	Nashville	2,264 / 2,264 (100%)	$79,240
9:30 Club	Washington, D.C.	2,400 / 2,400 (100%)	$84,000
Métropolis	Montreal	2,258 / 2,258 (100%)	$73,521
Aragon Ballroom	Chicago	4,873 / 4,873 (100%)	$155,936
State Theatre	Minneapolis	2,034 / 2,034 (100%)	$70,173
Fox Oakland Theatre	Oakland	5,143 / 5,600 (92%)	$192,925
Pomona Fox Theater	Pomona	1,365 / 1,400 (97%)	$45,094
Boulevard Pool	Paradise	2,542 / 3,200 (79%)	$88,970
Waller Creek Outdoor Amphitheatre	Austin	2,200 / 2,200 (100%)	$55,000
O_{2} World Hamburg	Hamburg	7,263 / 8,109 (89%)	$336,033
Regent Theatre	Melbourne	2,054 / 2,054 (100%)	$138,850
State Theatre	Sydney	1,993 / 1,993 (100%)	$134,727
Citibank Hall	Rio de Janeiro	950 / 7,029 (14%)	$67,078
Credicard Hall	São Paulo	2,702 / 4,847 (56%)	$202,188
Chevrolet Hall	Belo Horizonte	1,365 / 4,393 (31%)	$71,381
San Jose Civic Auditorium	San Jose	1,999 / 2,876 (70%)	$59,050
TOTAL		164,592 / 170,717 (96%)	$8,020,889
