= Greatest Hits (Snow Patrol album) =

Greatest hits album by Snow Patrol
- Released: 14 May 2013
- Genre: Alternative rock
- Length: 59:22
- Label: Polydor

Snow Patrol chronology
Fallen Empires (2011)	Greatest Hits (2013)	Wildness (2018)

Professional ratings
Review scores
Source	Rating
AllMusic	2.5/5 stars
Sputnikmusic	1/5

Greatest Hits is the first greatest hits album and second compilation album by Northern Irish alternative rock band Snow Patrol, released on 14 May 2013 through Polydor Records. Unlike their previous compilation album, Up to Now (2009), the album does not contain any tracks from before the release of Final Straw (2003).

== Track listing ==
Greatest Hits track listing
No.	Title	Original album	Length
1.	"The Lightning Strike (What If This Storm Ends?)" (single version)	A Hundred Million Suns (2008)	4:11
2.	"Chasing Cars"	Eyes Open (2006)	4:26
3.	"Run"	Final Straw (2003)	5:57
4.	"Set the Fire to the Third Bar" (featuring Martha Wainwright)	Eyes Open (2006)	3:23
5.	"Called Out in the Dark"	Fallen Empires (2011)	4:02
6.	"Chocolate"	Final Straw (2003)	3:01
7.	"Just Say Yes"	Up to Now (2009)	4:42
8.	"Open Your Eyes"	Eyes Open (2006)	5:40
9.	"Shut Your Eyes"	Eyes Open (2006)	3:17
10.	"Crack the Shutters"	A Hundred Million Suns (2008)	3:21
11.	"You Could Be Happy"	Eyes Open (2006)	3:03
12.	"Spitting Games"	Final Straw (2003)	3:47
13.	"Take Back the City"	A Hundred Million Suns (2008)	4:40
14.	"Make This Go On Forever"	Eyes Open (2006)	5:47

== Charts ==
Chart performance for Greatest Hits
Chart (2013)	Peak position
US Billboard 200	113
