= Don't Give In =

Don't Give In may refer to:

- Don't Give In, a 1981 album by Leon Patillo
- "Don't Give In", a 1980 song by Steel Pulse
- "Don't Give In", a 2018 song by Snow Patrol from Wildness
