= Blue Leach =

Music video director

Blue Leach is a video director. He is the winner of the 2009 TPI Video Director of the Year Award. He has recently directed shows for the Taking Back the Cities Tour for Snow Patrol. Other recent projects include R.E.M., directing the live album R.E.M. Live their first ever 2 CD/DVD in a career spanning 27 years for them. Linkin Park's "Road to Revolution: Live at Milton Keynes" which was filmed on 29 June 2008 at the National Bowl, Milton Keynes was the band's biggest Projekt Revolution show to date. Depeche Mode Touring the Angel Concert DVD Touring the Angel: Live in Milan was also directed by him. Blue's other projects have included The Prodigy, Beck, Paul Weller, Marilyn Manson, Manic Street Preachers, to name a few.

== Director credits ==
https://youtube.com/playlist?list=PL8Suy2AEmgvQn_AS5EcPhjembKx9zb_Te&si=BZwomPay9q1Nn5Ve

Eric Clapton 'Slowhand at 70' film for cinema and DVD, TV www.examinationproductions.com

- Linkin Park – "Projekt Revolution" (live)
- Snow Patrol – "The Lightning Strike"
- Snow Patrol – "Just Say Yes"
- Peter Gabriel – "New Blood Live in London"
- Pet Shop Boys – "Pandemonium Tour"
- Pet Shop Boys – "All Over the World"
