= The Forest Is the Path =

Studio album by Snow Patrol
- Released: 13 September 2024; 14 March 2025 (Extended Edition)
- Recorded: 2023–2024
- Length: 50:55
- Label: Polydor
- Producers: Fraser T. Smith; Gary Lightbody; Johnny McDaid

Snow Patrol chronology
Wildness (2018)	The Forest Is the Path (2024)

Singles from The Forest Is the Path
- 1. "The Beginning" Released: 29 May 2024; 2. "This Is the Sound of Your Voice" Released: 4 July 2024; 3. "All" Released: 8 August 2024; 4. "But I'll Keep Trying" Released: 29 January 2025

Professional ratings
Aggregate scores
Source	Rating
Metacritic	72/100
Review scores
Source	Rating
AllMusic	4/5 stars
Mojo	3/5 stars
MusicOMH	2.5/5 stars
The Telegraph	4/5 stars

The Forest Is the Path is the eighth studio album by Northern Irish alternative rock band Snow Patrol, released on 13 September 2024 through Polydor Records. It is their first album after the departures of bassist Paul Wilson and drummer Jonny Quinn and their first in six years after their seventh album, Wildness (2018).

== Background ==
In September 2023, Quinn and Wilson both left Snow Patrol. Frontman Gary Lightbody confirmed that the band will continue as a trio of himself with remaining members Nathan Connolly and Johnny McDaid. At the same time, he confirmed that the band was working on the album which would be released the following year, having announced as such in July 2023.

In May 2024, the release date was announced to be 13 September of that year. They released the first single "The Beginning" on 29 May, the second "This Is The Sound of Your Voice" on 4 July, and the third "All" on 8 August.

== Track listing ==
No.	Title	Length
1.	"All"	4:18
2.	"The Beginning"	3:31
3.	"Everything's Here and Nothing's Lost"	4:06
4.	"Your Heart Home"	3:39
5.	"This Is the Sound of Your Voice"	4:30
6.	"Hold Me in the Fire"	4:00
7.	"Years That Fall"	3:51
8.	"Never Really Tire"	5:54
9.	"These Lies"	4:48
10.	"What If Nothing Breaks?"	3:42
11.	"Talking About Hope"	3:55
12.	"The Forest Is the Path"	4:30
Total length:		50:44

All lyrics are written by Gary Lightbody, Johnny McDaid and Nathan Connolly; all music is composed by Snow Patrol (except where noted).

Extended Edition bonus tracks
No.	Title	Length
13.	"But I'll Keep Trying"	3:11
14.	"This Is the Silence"	2:59
15.	"What's Left in the Light"	3.25
16.	"Waking Up Now"	3.39
17.	"Falling Through All of This Time"	4.06
18.	"This Is the Sound of Your Voice (Will Reynolds Remix)"	4.48
Total length:		1:12:52

== Personnel ==
Snow Patrol

- Gary Lightbody – vocals, backing vocals, guitars, bass programming, synthesizers
- Nathan Connolly – guitar, backing vocals
- Johnny McDaid – guitars, keyboards, piano, synthesizers, bass and drum programming, backing vocals

Additional personnel

- Ash Soan – drums
- Ben Epstein – bass guitar
- Fraser T. Smith – producer

== Charts ==
Chart performance for The Forest Is the Path
Chart (2024)	Peak position
Austrian Albums (Ö3 Austria)	17
Belgian Albums (Ultratop Flanders)	12
Belgian Albums (Ultratop Wallonia)	9
Dutch Albums (Album Top 100)	3
German Albums (Offizielle Top 100)	13
Irish Albums (Official Charts)	2
Scottish Albums (Official Charts)	1
Swiss Albums (Schweizer Hitparade)	10
UK Albums (Official Charts)	1
US Top Album Sales (Billboard)	35
