= Wildness (album) =

Studio album by Snow Patrol
- Released: 25 May 2018
- Recorded: 2016–2017
- Genres: Alternative rock; pop rock; indie rock
- Length: 44:39
- Label: Polydor
- Producer: Jacknife Lee

Snow Patrol chronology
Greatest Hits (2013)	Wildness (2018)	The Forest Is the Path (2024)

Singles from Wildness
- 1. "Don't Give In" Released: 21 March 2018; 2. "Life on Earth" Released: 12 April 2018; 3. "What If This Is All the Love You Ever Get?" Released: 2 May 2018; 4. "Empress" Released: 8 May 2018

Wildness is the seventh studio album by Northern Irish alternative rock band Snow Patrol. The album was released on 25 May 2018, hitting number 2 on the UK charts. The album reveals personal and existential themes.

== Background and development ==
In an interview with NME in 2012, Gary Lightbody said that he had to overcome a bout of writer's block and that the songs written for the new album were scrapped before being replaced by new "mind-boggling" material. The follow-up to 2011's Fallen Empires was initially due for release in 2016, and subsequently summer 2017. In late January 2018, the title and release date were officially announced.

== Promotion ==
"Don't Give In" was released as the first single for Wildness on 21 March 2018. "Life on Earth" was released as the second single from the album on 12 April 2018. "What If This Is All the Love You Ever Get?" was released as the third single on 2 May 2018. "Empress" was released as the fourth single on 8 May 2018.

== Critical reception ==
Professional ratings
Review scores
Source	Rating
AllMusic	4/5 stars
Drowned in Sound	7/10
The Independent	2/5 stars
Paste	7.9/10
Pitchfork	4.8/10
Q	4/5 stars
Under the Radar	3.5/10

Wildness received generally positive reviews from critics. On the review aggregator website Metacritic, the album has a weighted average score of 64 out of 100 based on 9 reviews, indicating "generally favorable reviews".

Pitchfork gave the album a score of 4.8 out of 10, calling it "their most personal album" and saying it "deals in matters of literal life and death".

== Commercial performance ==
After an extremely close chart race, the album debuted at number two on the UK Albums Chart on sales of 39,118, less than 1,000 sales behind The Greatest Showman: Original Motion Picture Soundtrack.

== Track listing ==
All lyrics are written by Gary Lightbody; all music is composed by Snow Patrol and Jacknife Lee, except "Life and Death" by Snow Patrol, Lee, Holger Czukay, Irmin Schmidt, Michael Karoli and Jaki Liebezeit.

No.	Title	Length
1.	"Life on Earth"	5:22
2.	"Don't Give In"	3:59
3.	"Heal Me"	4:01
4.	"Empress"	4:29
5.	"A Dark Switch"	4:18
6.	"What If This Is All the Love You Ever Get?"	3:48
7.	"A Youth Written in Fire"	4:08
8.	"Soon"	4:21
9.	"Wild Horses"	4:38
10.	"Life and Death"	5:35
Total length:		44:39

Deluxe edition bonus tracks
No.	Title	Length
11.	"Life on Earth" (alternate version)	4:41
12.	"Don't Give In" (alternate version)	3:37
13.	"Heal Me" (alternate version)	4:33
14.	"What If This Is All the Love You Ever Get?" (alternate version)	4:16
15.	"Soon" (alternate version)	3:32
Total length:		65:18

== Personnel ==
Snow Patrol

- Gary Lightbody – lead vocals, guitar (except tracks 6 and 15), additional programming (track 7), backing vocals (tracks 11, 12 and 14)
- Nathan Connolly – guitar (except tracks 6 and 15), backing vocals (except tracks 1, 6, 8 and 15)
- Paul Wilson – bass (except tracks 6, 11–15)
- Jonny Quinn – drums (except tracks 6, 11–15)
- Johnny McDaid – piano (tracks 4, 6, 7, 8, 9, 10, 11 and 14), backing vocals (except tracks 1, 6, 8, 10 and 15), keyboards (tracks 1, 11–15), guitar (tracks 3, 11–14), programming (tracks 11–15), orchestral arrangement (tracks 11–15)

Additional personnel

- Jacknife Lee – guitar (except tracks 6, 11–15), keyboards (except tracks 6, 11–15), programming (except tracks 6, 11–15), backing vocals (tracks 3, 4, 9 and 10), strings arrangement (track 5 and 8), bass (track 9)
- Davide Rossi – strings arrangement and strings quartet (tracks 1, 5 and 8)
- Saran Davies – cello (tracks 11–15)
- Ben Hulme – French horn (tracks 11, 14 and 15)
- Alexandra Ridout – trumpet (track 12), flugelhorn (tracks 13–15)

== Charts ==
=== Weekly charts ===
Weekly chart performance for Wildness
Chart (2018)	Peak position
Australian Albums (ARIA)	12
Austrian Albums (Ö3 Austria)	11
Belgian Albums (Ultratop Flanders)	2
Belgian Albums (Ultratop Wallonia)	3
Canadian Albums (Billboard)	52
Czech Albums (ČNS IFPI)	31
Dutch Albums (Album Top 100)	5
German Albums (Offizielle Top 100)	9
Irish Albums (IRMA)	1
New Zealand Heatseeker Albums (RMNZ)	1
Scottish Albums (Official Charts)	1
Spanish Albums (PROMUSICAE)	59
Swiss Albums (Schweizer Hitparade)	3
UK Albums (Official Charts)	2
US Billboard 200	49

=== Year-end charts ===
Year-end chart performance for Wildness
Chart (2018)	Position
Belgian Albums (Ultratop Flanders)	50
Belgian Albums (Ultratop Wallonia)	102
UK Albums (OCC)	58

== Certifications ==
Certifications for Wildness
Region	Certification	Certified units/sales
United Kingdom (BPI)	Gold	100,000^{‡}
^{‡} Sales+streaming figures based on certification alone.
