= Just Say Yes (song) =

Single by Snow Patrol

from the album Up to Now
- B-side: "Just Say Yes" (Thin White Duke Mix)
- Released: 23 October 2009
- Genre: Synth-pop; electronica
- Length: 4:42
- Label: Fiction; Interscope
- Songwriters: Gary Lightbody; Jacknife Lee
- Producer: Jacknife Lee

Snow Patrol singles chronology
"The Planets Bend Between Us" (2009)	"Just Say Yes" (2009)	"An Olive Grove Facing the Sea" (2009)

"Just Say Yes" is a song by Northern Irish alternative rock band Snow Patrol, released as the single to follow "The Planets Bend Between Us" in October–November 2009, depending on the region. The song, produced by Jacknife Lee, is one of the three new songs and the lead single of the band's first compilation album, Up to Now (2009). The lyrics were written by Gary Lightbody and the music was composed by Snow Patrol. "Just Say Yes" has its origins as a song written for pop singer Gwen Stefani, who rejected it. Nicole Scherzinger of the Pussycat Dolls was then given permission by Lightbody to record it for her solo debut album, which was later shelved.

Snow Patrol later took the song back and recorded it for their compilation album Up to Now. The song, having an electronic, synthpop sound, marks a distinct change in the Snow Patrol's sound, with writer Gary Lightbody calling it their most adventurous single to date. The video, directed by Blue Leach, features light effects and projection to bring a trippy, dreamy feel. The song was used in a music campaign for Nokia in the Netherlands. It was also used in the trailer for the 2010 film Leap Year. The city of Derry, Northern Ireland was given permission to use the song in their successful bid to be crowned UK City of Culture 2013.

It performed well commercially, reaching the top 10 on the singles chart in countries like Belgium, Denmark and Ireland and topped the charts in the Netherlands. However, the critical reaction was mixed. Reviews generally praised the song for encompassing the band's past and new sound. The negative reviews criticized the song for being too linear, and for not having any "spark".

== Background ==
The song was written by Gary Lightbody in Los Angeles with producer Jacknife Lee. He wrote it at the request of the band's label in the United States for pop singer Gwen Stefani's then upcoming album. However, Stefani rejected it. Later, Lightbody allowed Pussycat Dolls lead singer Nicole Scherzinger to record it. Scherzinger had loved the song, and felt grateful and "blessed" upon being given permission to record it, even calling it an "honour" to sing something written by Lightbody. Scherzinger felt influenced by the Northern Irish Lightbody's accent, and attempted to record the song with an accent herself, with Lightbody acting as the producer. Though she was nervous about doing justice to the song, she was relieved when Lightbody told her that her singing had made his mother cry. The song was due to feature on Scherzinger's solo debut album Her Name is Nicole (2006) which was subsequently scrapped. A brand new debut album Killer Love was released in 2011, scrapping much of the earlier recorded material. According to ASCAP, who register recordings and song rights in the US, The Pussycat Dolls also recorded and registered the song. When Snow Patrol's label in the United Kingdom heard the song, they were shocked to learn that Lightbody had given away the song in the first place. Lightbody then reclaimed the song for the band.

"..."Just Say Yes", [which] is our most adventurous single to date, it shows we can go anywhere or do anything with our next album, and I can't wait to get stuck into it. Most of the writing we're doing now will be thrown out the window to approach it completely fresh".

— Gary Lightbody

At the V Festival in August 2009, Lightbody in an interview to NME revealed that the song was to be the band's next single and that it will feature on the compilation Up to Now, accompanying the Reworked Tour of November–December 2009. Where Scherzinger's recording was a soft and slow song with an electronic beat, the new recording was far from that. The band changed the texture fully to predominantly electronic and synth. Drummer Jonny Quinn called the song a progression for the band.

The song is about "loving someone so much that you get exasperated they aren't showing the same amount of passion that you are". The Denver Post described the song as an "electronic-infused, '80s-kissed track". Lightbody, who as a teenager loved dance music and frequented nightclubs, says "Just Say Yes" is a song that the band has always "had in them", but expressed surprise at the fact it took 15 years to happen. Quinn admitted the band were worried and knew they were taking a chance with the song. He felt a lot of people might hate it, but said the band had no regrets doing it.

== Promotion and release ==
The song received its first airplay on Zane Lowe's BBC Radio 1 show on 17 September 2009. Lightbody joined Lowe on air via phone from Toronto, the band's scheduled tour stop. The song made Xfm's main playlist, was also added on BBC Radio 1's C list on 30 September 2009 and was later promoted to the B list on 7 October and the A list on 21 October 2009. It was later added to BBC Radio 2's C list on 10 October 2009, and got played 5 times a week. The song became one of the three top songs in rotation on several radio stations in Netherlands. Additionally, it was picked up for Nokia's Comes With Music campaign on the TV and internet, which ran for eight weeks. The band appeared on T4 programme on Channel 4 twice. On 31 October, they made an appearance on a special show called "4Music Favorites: Snow Patrol", giving an interview, playing "Just Say Yes" and past singles "Chasing Cars" and "Chocolate". The next night, the band visited the T4 Studio to play the single.

The single was released on 30 October 2009 in Ireland and the Netherlands and 2 November 2009 in the UK, about a week before the album was released. In the United States, the single was released digitally on the iTunes Store and Amazon.com on 23 October 2009 (although the US iTunes Store records a 1 November release). The b-side of the physical single is a remix of the song, called the "Thin White Duke Mix". It was done by Stuart Price.

== Music video ==
The band performs the song with light effects in the background.

The music video for the song was produced by James Bolton and directed by Blue Leach, who has previously directed the video/mini-film for the sixteen-minute "The Lightning Strike", which was used during live performances and is included on Up to Now. The video for "Just Say Yes" premiered on 22 September 2009 on MSN and AOL, respectively for users in the United Kingdom and the United States. The video was shot in an inflatable dome (called the Eventhaus Plus) in Poland. The dome was enhanced by lighting and projection. The video features the band members dressed in white performing the song on their instruments. The whole performance is supplemented by several light effects projected on the dome's white background, giving the appearance of a disco/nightclub.

The video has been described as a "spacey, mental hospital-esque padded bandshell underneath trippy, rave-ish lights". Spinner.com praised it, calling the light effects "impressive", saying they added a "dreamy spin" to the performance. MTV reviewer Chris Ryan felt that there was plenty about the video to make fun of, but found it to be good. Filter called it a "perfect winter time companion".

== Track listing ==
- CD single:
1. "Just Say Yes" – 4:42
2. "Just Say Yes" (Thin White Duke Mix) (Edit) – 4:14
- Australian iTunes:
1. "Just Say Yes" – 4:42
2. "Just Say Yes" (Thin White Duke Mix) – 7:26
3. "Shut Your Eyes" (Live) – 9:09

Live track recorded at V Festival, Chelmsford on 23 August 2009.

- UK/Irish iTunes:
1. "Just Say Yes" – 4:42
2. "Just Say Yes" (Video) – 4:12
- US iTunes/Amazon.com:
1. "Just Say Yes" – 4:42

== Critical reception ==
EW called Scherzinger's version "elegant" and Rap-Up magazine "understated". Critical reaction towards Snow Patrol's version was mixed. Q magazine picked the song as their Track of the Day on 15 October 2009. It noted the change in musical direction with the usage of beats and synthesizers, but still calling it "undoubtedly Snow Patrol", writing that the song was trademark Snow Patrol: Lightbody's love-ridden lyrics with stadium-sized guitar lines and a sweeping chorus. MTV reviewer Chris Ryan liked the song, and wrote that the vocal parts and the video's light show were very cheesy but they went well with the song. He however noted that the song had the same style of build-up and release of past hits "Run" and "Chasing Cars", with "some Simple Minds/sedated in the 80s keyboards" added to "up the romance." Planet Sound gave the single 7 out of 10. Reviewer John Earls said that the song encompassed the band's early sound and recent ballads, and felt it will keep the listener intrigued as to what the band does next.

However, Digital Spy's review of the single was negative. Reviewer Mayer Nissim gave it 2 stars out of 5 and said that the song does not succeed as a new sound for the band, and that it merely sounded as if it had been created on a "few floaty keys". He criticised the song for utilizing the "same over-earnest lyrics and soporific melodies as ever", and sarcastically noted that guitarist Nathan Connolly was not lying when he said that the band will continue to sound like "Snow Patrol", no matter what musical direction they take. BBC's Fraser McAlpine gave the single 2 stars out of 5. He said that it "wanted" itself to be seen as something magical, but did not have good enough tricks to do so. He criticised the linearity of the song, citing that it had only two melody lines: one for the verse and another for the chorus. The song has gained popularity with the Emmerdale fanbase after being used as backing music for Jackson Walsh and Aaron Livesy's second kiss.

== Commercial performance ==
The song was described as being a potential worldwide hit, in the vein of the Snow Patrol song "Chasing Cars". The single did well on the iTunes Store, becoming the top selling song on the Dutch and Irish iTunes and the third best selling single in Belgium. In the French-speaking part of the country, Wallonia, the song debuted the first position on the component Ultratip chart. The single did well in the Netherlands. It was chosen as the "Record of the Week" in the Netherlands by two radio stations: by Radio 538 for week 39 of 2009 and by 3FM. It subsequently debuted at the top of the Dutch Tipparade and 3FM Mega Top 50 in its first week on both charts, and also became the highest-charting single of the band in the Netherlands by reaching the first position, succeeding the success of "Shut Your Eyes" and "Crack the Shutters" which peaked at fourteen. The song also peaked at the second position on the Dutch Single Top 100 chart, which contains physical and digital sales, and became the most downloaded song in the country. In the United States, for the 25th anniversary of Billboard's Adult Alternative Airplay chart in early 2021, the magazine would rank "Just Say Yes" at number 85 on its list of the top 100 most successful songs in the history of the chart.

== Charts ==
=== Weekly charts ===
Weekly chart performance
Chart (2009–2010)	Peak position
Austria (Ö3 Austria Top 40)	38
Belgium (Ultratop 50 Flanders)	6
Belgium (Ultratop 50 Wallonia)	8
Denmark (Tracklisten)	4
Denmark Airplay (Tracklisten)	9
European Hot 100 Singles (Billboard)	24
Finland (Suomen virallinen lista)	20
Germany (GfK)	47
Ireland (IRMA)	6
Japan (Japan Hot 100)	39
Netherlands (Dutch Top 40)	1
Netherlands (Single Top 100)	2
Scottish Singles Sales (Official Charts)	11
UK Singles (Official Charts)	15
US Adult Alternative Airplay (Billboard)	4
US Hot Rock & Alternative Songs (Billboard)	39

=== Year-end charts ===
Annual chart rankings
Chart (2009)	Position
Netherlands (Dutch Top 40)	34
Netherlands (Single Top 100)	33

Chart (2010)	Position
Netherlands (Dutch Top 40)	42
Netherlands (Single Top 100)	94

== Certifications ==
Certifications and sales
Region	Certification	Certified units/sales
Denmark (IFPI Danmark)	Gold	45,000^{‡}
United Kingdom (BPI)	Gold	400,000^{‡}
^{‡} Sales+streaming figures based on certification alone.

== Release history ==
Street dates
Country	Date	Format	Label
United States	23 October 2009	Digital download	Interscope
Netherlands	27 October 2009	Digital download	Universal
Ireland	30 October 2009	Compact Disc	Fiction
Netherlands	30 October 2009	Compact Disc	Universal
United Kingdom, Ireland	1 November 2009	Digital download	Fiction
United Kingdom	2 November 2009	Compact Disc	Fiction
