= The Lightning Strike =

2008 song performed by Snow Patrol

"The Lightning Strike (What If This Storm Ends?)"

Single by Snow Patrol

from the album A Hundred Million Suns and Greatest Hits
- Released: 25 February 2013
- Recorded: 2008
- Studio: Grouse Lodge (County Westmeath, Ireland)
- Genre: Alternative rock; progressive rock; space rock
- Length: 4:10
- Label: Polydor (UK)
- Composers: Gary Lightbody; Nathan Connolly; Paul Wilson; Jonny Quinn; Tom Simpson
- Lyricist: Gary Lightbody
- Producer: Jacknife Lee

Snow Patrol singles chronology
"Lifening" (2012)	"The Lightning Strike (What If This Storm Ends?)" (2013)	"Don't Give In" (2018)

"The Lightning Strike" is a song by Northern Irish alternative rock band Snow Patrol from their fifth album, A Hundred Million Suns (2008). The lyrics of the song were written by lead singer Gary Lightbody and the music was composed by Snow Patrol. The song is composed of three smaller songs and, at sixteen minutes and eighteen seconds, is the longest song that the band has ever released.

The song has an elaborate live performance where a specially made animation is played simultaneously as the band performs the song. Most of the video features origami, which is the main artwork for the album and its singles. The song received a mixed reaction when the album was released, and though the band were praised for playing it live, the general feeling was that it wasn't a right choice, with one critic calling it "self-indulgent" but forgivable.

== Conception and composition ==
In an interview with The Daily Telegraph, lyricist Gary Lightbody revealed the song was conceived after he was caught in a heavy storm one night in Glasgow: "I was pretty terrified – 150-mile-an-hour winds, trees falling down. But we went outside the house, and it was also just thrilling. There was this howling wind, but it felt like silence, as if our senses were being too bombarded to cope with what was going on. So the record was born out of that feeling, of two people having a protective shell around each other. I'm not saying there's not darkness in there still, but it's happening from outward factors more than inward. Maybe things are terrifying, but they're beautiful, too. The world is extremely surprising".

"We can't write a 16-minute song just like that, as it takes an almost zen-like state to achieve without losing your place or going quite mad."

— Gary Lightbody

In August 2008, Lightbody joked about the song in a press release on the band's website, which revealed the track-listing for the then unreleased album: "The last song is sixteen-minutes long and by far the longest we've ever done. Don't be frightened though, it's great. Although, for now, you'll have to take my word for that and I'm pretty biased I have to say". At the time of the release of the album, SP.com posted a section featuring Gary Lightbody discussing the new songs, which was initially a Lightbody interview to RTÉ. The interview revealed that the song was initially three different songs. However, the band felt that they "worked so well together it was obvious they belonged in one place".

== Recording and production ==
The three songs are "What If This Storm Ends?", "The Sunlight Through the Flags", and "Daybreak". "What If This Storm Ends?" was recorded at Olympic Studios in London and features brass choir. The second part, "The Sunlight Through the Flags", is set on the west coast of Ireland and was recorded at Grouse Lodge, County Westmeath, Ireland. According to the wishes of producer Jacknife Lee, the third and last part, "Daybreak", was recorded at Hansa Tonstudios in Berlin, where David Bowie recorded "Heroes" in the '70s and U2 recorded Achtung Baby in the '90s. Lightbody commented that "Daybreak" "was really affected by Hansa" and "has that Krautrock hypnotic sway to it, and "Heroes"-type guitars swooning over the top", and it made a fitting end to the album.

The band specifically chose to keep the song the last track on the album. In an interview, Lightbody said "We felt like it hopefully leaves you wondering "what's next?", making you want more".

In an interview to Glide Magazine, Nathan Connolly spoke of the band's desire to not sound like their earlier work, but still maintain their "melody and honesty". The song grew out of the band trying to progress musically. Connolly also felt that the song requires repeated listening to grow on a person, like acquired taste.

== Release history ==
The song initially appeared on the album versions of A Hundred Million Suns. On various online music stores including the iTunes Store, the song is labeled "album-only", making it inaccessible for individual purchase.

A live MP3, recorded during the UK & Ireland Arena Tour of February–March 2009 was gifted to fans as a free download on every ticket purchase for the Reworked Tour of November–December 2009. Each ticket came with a special code that enabled the download.

In light of its usage in the Epic trailer, on 25 February 2013, "The Lightning Strike (What If This Storm Ends?)" was released as a stand-alone single. Furthermore, on 9 March 2013, the band announced on social media websites such as Facebook that they had released the accompanying music video on their YouTube channel. The stand-alone "What If This Storm Ends?" was released on their second compilation album, Greatest Hits (2013).

=== Track listing ===
1. "What If This Storm Ends?" – 5:10
2. "The Sunlight Through the Flags" – 4:17
3. "Daybreak" – 6:51

2013 "What If This Storm Ends?" download single

1. "What If This Storm Ends?" – 4:10

2013 "What If This Storm Ends?" US Promo CD-single

1. "What If This Storm Ends?" – 4:10
2. "What If This Storm Ends? (Edit)" – 3:34

== Music video ==
=== Live-performance version ===
"One night during an electrical storm last winter in Glasgow we penned these pieces of music whilst constructing the new album A Hundred Million Suns

We decided to connect these three songs together and give them one name.

Ladies and gentlemen we give you...

The Lightning Strike"

— Message preceding the video

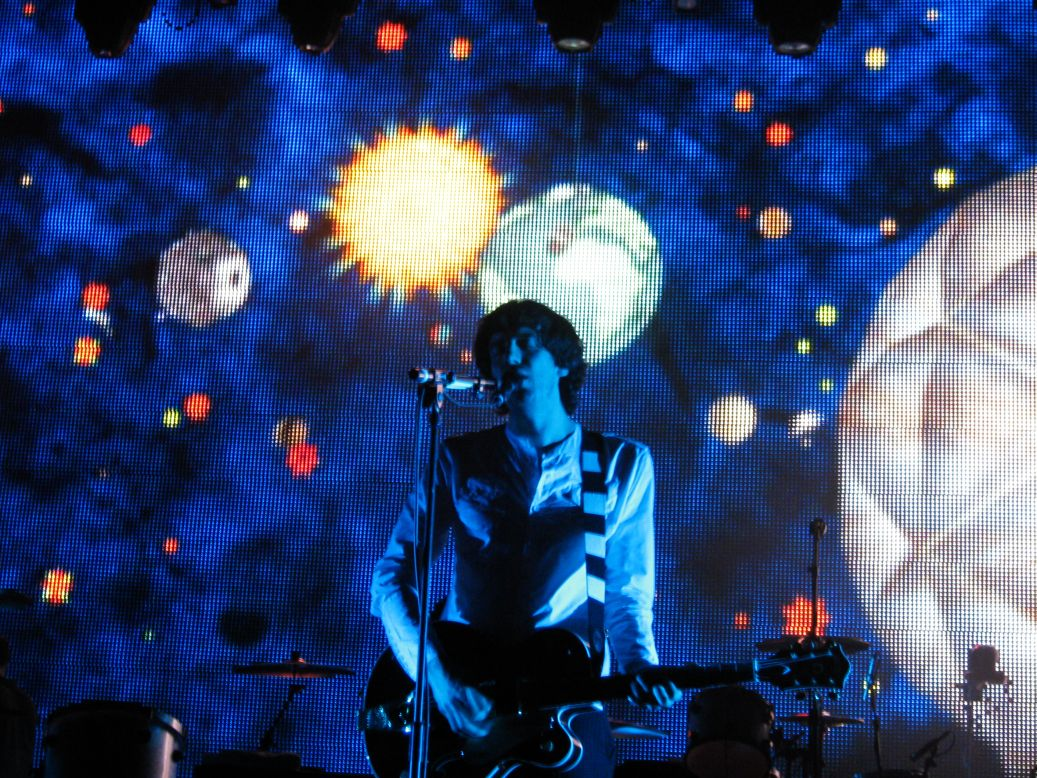
Live performance on the Taking Back the Cities Tour.

"The Lightning Strike" has an elaborate live performance with the band playing the song in the backdrop of a projection screen on which a specially made video is played simultaneously; one such performance at the Pinkpop Festival in Landgraaf, Netherlands is available via the band's Vevo YouTube channel.

The idea for the video was conceived by Gary Lightbody. Snow Patrol's tour video director Blue Leach collaborated with production company Atticus Finch to create the video, which represents Lightbody's idea to represent the world as origami. Finch brought Undabo Studios into the project to "help develop an origami style of modeling and texturing" that appears on the album artwork for A Hundred Million Suns.

The video's theme uses a colorful visual language; the birth and development of a star, a spiralling galaxy, and its millions of pieces, which flow smoothly into each other; the formation of space, birds, animated rockets, satellites, fishes, havens, oceans, boats, cities, landscapes, rainbows, cars, and planets and many other visual impressions. The "CGI origami" gig features the band members themselves performing as origami figures. The video was made using Autodesk Softimage and took about three months to make. It consists of 24,000 frames of animation and is played of a 60×40 ft. projection screen in live performances for the first 6 minutes, which then moves to LED screens suspended behind the band.

Director Blue Leach later won the "TPi Award" in 2009 for his work with Snow Patrol, amongst others.

=== Full animated version ===
A scene from the full-length animated video, which is also played when Snow Patrol performs the song live.

The full sixteen-minute animated video for "The Lightning Strike" is available via Vimeo and saw its official release as a part of Up to Now (2009), the band's first compilation album. The video can also be found on the bonus DVDs of the Digipak and box-set releases of the Up to Now album.

=== "What If This Storm Ends?" animated version ===
A four-minute animated video for "What If This Storm Ends?" was uploaded by the band on their YouTube channel. Just like live performances, the video features an elaborate animation involving origami.

== Reception ==
The song received a generally mixed reception at the time of album release. Spin called it "dramatic". Rolling Stone was quite positive about the song, saying "the band distinguishes itself from the post-Coldplay pack with a flair for arrangements that almost justifies the grandiosity of 16-minute epics like "The Lightning Strike"".

PopMatters' response was very positive. Reviewer Ross Langager called the song "a 16-minute, three-movement celestial metaphor of operatic grandeur and overwhelming beauty". He further praised the song, saying: "Linked together by alike synthesizer bedrocks of gradually increasing warmth and brightness, the song-cycle progresses from silver-lined dark clouds to hints of dawn before finally settling on a lovely, sun-drenched morning. But even when faced by such an inexorable process of hopefulness, Lightbody has to temper the surge of light: "Slowly the day breaks/Apart in our hands"".

The Independent's Andy Gill, however, had mixed feelings about the song. He said that the song was an attempt to "broaden the band's style". He called it ambitious and felt that "its incorporation of minimalist techniques, glockenspiel, brass colouration and shoegazey guitar textures" made the song "lengthy". He made comparisons with Coldplay, calling the band "self-absorbed" but said Snow Patrol were "more bearable".

On the other hand, Pitchfork Media's Joshua Love reviewed the song negatively, writing that it seemed as if the band was "striving to be taken more seriously", by "stringing together three ponderous, already-overlong songs and calling the impenetrable result a 16-minute stand-alone epic "The Lightning Strike"". He further wrote that the band's wasn't talented enough to do justice to "these newer, more artful ambitions".

=== Live-performance reception ===
Critical reception of the live performance has been generally mixed as well, though the band has been praised for playing it. Contactmusic.com reviewed a Snow Patrol concert at the M.E.N. Arena on 7 March 2009. Though it called the song "ambitious by anyone's standards" and praised the animation calling it "impressive", it felt the song wasn't the best choice for an encore. WalesOnline's Paul Rowland wrote a review of the gig at Cardiff International Arena the next day. He praised the song, calling it a "three-movement epic". He reported that, though the song was a welcome change in the encore, some fans did not appreciate it and headed home: "After all, they'd already heard "Run", and the traffic's awful this time of night". The same happened at a free gig at iTunes Festival 2009 at The Roundhouse in London. In The News, Chris Jefferies reported that the band had to play the song to a "half-empty crowd", but had praise for the band saying "there is much, much more to this band".

Durham21's Ian Church covered the next gig on 10 March at the Metro Radio Arena. He reported that for the encore, a large semi-transparent sheet was dropped in front of the stage, to project the animation. He said that it was "surprising" the band chose to play the "practically unknown" song, but reported that "it somehow managed to capture those watching" but a few fans were left complaining about the song choice. Journal Live also covered the concert, with Helen Dalby writing that it was "interesting" and "different" for the band to play the song, but she wasn't "entirely sure it quite worked". She felt the song might have worked if it was played earlier in the set.

Evening Standard's Amira Hashish covered the last concert at The O2 and wrote a positive review about the performance of the song, though she felt to song(s) was "lesser known"; but, she felt the band brought them to life and, though it was "a little self-indulgent", the band could be forgiven.

James Cabooter of Daily Star, who covered the show at Bloomsbury Theatre wrote that the newer material (including "The Lightning Strike") was deeper and more mature sonically.

== Live performances ==
The Taking Back the Cities Tour generally featured "What If This Storm Ends?" as an encore. The full song has usually not been played, but it has been known to make appearances; it finally made its live debut during the UK & Ireland Arena Tour, where it was played regularly. It also made appearances during the following European leg, though it was not played on all dates.

The song was not played during the shows with the band supporting Coldplay on the Viva la Vida Tour and U2 on the U2 360° Tour.

== Personnel ==
Snow Patrol

- Gary Lightbody – vocals, guitar, backing vocals
- Nathan Connolly – guitar, backing vocals
- Paul Wilson – bass guitar, backing vocals
- Jonny Quinn – drums
- Tom Simpson – keyboards

Other personnel

- Jacknife Lee – producer, mixing
- Cenzo Townshend – mixing
- John Davis – mastering
- Avshalom Caspi – brass arrangement
- Mo Hausler – brass, choir recorder
- Phil Rose – brass, choir recorder
- Exmoor Singers of London – choir
- James Jarvis – choir director
- Evgeny Chubykin – horns
- Jocelyn Lightfoot – horns
- Kira Doherty – horns
- Philip Eastop – horns
- Richard Bayliss – horns
- Timothy Brown – horns
- Colin Sheen – trombone
- Dan Jenkins – trombone
- David Stewart – bass trombone
- Ian Fasham – bass trombone
- Guy Barker – trumpet
- John Barclay – trumpet
- Mark Law – trumpet
- Pat White – trumpet
- James Anderson – tuba
- Stephen Wick – tuba

Undabo Studios

- Doug Kennedy – director, key creative, animation, composition
- Simon Brown – key creative, animation, modeling
- Chris Whittle – modeling
- Ed Olive – additional modeling
- Nick Hales – additional modeling, character animation
- Chris Millsy – character animation
- Darren Cullis – additional character rigging
- Hearl Hutchinson – additional character animation

Atticus Finch

- Chris Richmond – creative director
- Jim Waters – producer

Splinter Films

- Blue Leach – director
- Emer Patten – producer

== In popular culture ==
The full song was used in "Don't Cry for Me, Albuquerque", an episode of In Plain Sight, in 2009, while the first part of the song, "What If This Storm Ends?", appeared in a 2011 trailer for the war movie Act of Valor, starring real-life Navy SEALs, and in the trailers to the 2013 animated film Epic. It was also used in season 8 of One Tree Hill.
