= Fallen Empires (album) =

Studio album by Snow Patrol
- Released: 11 November 2011
- Recorded: October 2010 – May 2011
- Genre: Alternative rock; indietronica; indie rock; pop rock
- Length: 57:17
- Label: Fiction; Island (US)
- Producer: Jacknife Lee

Snow Patrol chronology
A Hundred Million Suns (2008)	Fallen Empires (2011)	Greatest Hits (2013)

Singles from Fallen Empires
- 1. "Called Out in the Dark" Released: 2 September 2011; 2. "This Isn't Everything You Are" Released: 14 October 2011; 3. "New York" Released: 20 December 2011; 4. "In the End" Released: 13 February 2012; 5. "Lifening" Released: 5 July 2012

Fallen Empires is the sixth studio album by Northern Irish alternative rock band Snow Patrol, released on 11 November 2011 (10 January 2012 in North America). It is their first album to feature future member Johnny McDaid, who was credited as guest musician and songwriter in the album liner notes, and would officially join the band following the tour. It is also their last album with keyboardist Tom Simpson, who left the band in 2013. American singer Lissie provided additional vocals for six songs on the album ("I'll Never Let Go", "The Weight of Love", "The Garden Rules", "Fallen Empires", "Berlin", and "Those Distant Bells").

== Background and development ==
When asked about the writing process for the album, Gary Lightbody commented, "It's the longest album we've ever made by far but also the best. We took our time and I also had some bouts of writer's block. It's the first time it's happened for such a long time. I've had days when I haven't been able to write. Since 2009, I've gone through three writer's blocks but I'm glad because the results are great afterwards. They probably made me write better songs." Snow Patrol planned a "Fallen Empires Tour" in 2012 with the first date being at the O2 in Dublin. The song "New York" can be heard at the end of "Suddenly" (Season 8 Episode 10) of Grey's Anatomy. The song is also played in "After School Special" (Season 4 Episode 10) of The Vampire Diaries.

== Singles ==
- "Called Out in the Dark" was released as the first single from the album on 2 September 2011 in the UK as an EP. A video was released for the song before its release date on 17 August 2011.
- "This Isn't Everything You Are" was announced as the second single from the album on Snow Patrol's official site. It was released on 14 October 2011.
- "New York" was the third single from the album released in America on 20 December 2011.
- "In the End" was released as the fourth single on 13 February.
- "Lifening" was the fifth single and was released on 5 July.

== Reception ==
=== Critical reception ===
Professional ratings
Aggregate scores
Source	Rating
Metacritic	58/100
Review scores
Source	Rating
AllMusic	3.5/5 stars
Clash	4/10
Entertainment Weekly	B
The Guardian	3/5 stars
The Independent	3/5 stars
Los Angeles Times	1.5/4 stars
Pitchfork	4.8/10
Rolling Stone	2.5/5 stars
Spin	5/10
Toronto Star	2.5/4 stars

Fallen Empires received mixed reviews from critics. According to the website Metacritic, which assigns a weighted mean rating out of 100 to reviews from mainstream critics, the album received an average review score of 58/100, based on 25 reviews, which indicates "mixed or average reviews".

James Christopher Monger wrote a favorable review for Allmusic, stating that the album "establishes an expansive vista of sound early on, bathing fairly simple melodies in waves of fastidious loops and sparse percussion." Mike Haydock wrote a positive review for BBC Music, analysing that "Best of all are the moments when Snow Patrol blend the two approaches together, combining their own aesthetic with an Achtung Baby adoration." Entertainment Weekly's Melissa Maerz wrote that "For all the sentiment, it's the simplest stuff that rings true." The New York Times's Nate Chinen praised the songwriting, saying that "What makes this all feel reasonably unforced is the abiding earnestness in the songwriting." The A.V. Club wrote that the album "it's comforting at worst and occasionally fantastic."

Dave Simpson wrote an average review, saying that "Although the variation in styles doesn't make for the most cohesive album, the default mood is still downbeat but anthemic--songs for couples to cling tightly to one another while raising mobiles in the air." While Now Magazine found out that "In the first few songs they stretch themselves creatively and come up with promising results, but halfway through it's back to overwrought ballads and middle-of-the-road mid-tempo rock songs." A mixed review came from Rolling Stone's Stacey Anderson, who wrote that "Snow Patrol fall back to the blandly inoffensive safe zone--though at least they sound a little brighter." Pitchfork wrote that "the results are goofy." The Daily Telegraph criticized the album for "stick[ing] too rigidly to the formula."

=== Commercial performance ===
In 2011, Fallen Empires sold 269,000 copies in the UK. The album debuted at number five on the US Billboard 200 chart, selling 31,000 copies. It became the band's highest debut on the Billboard chart and the second album to reach the top-ten.

== Track listing ==
All lyrics are written by Gary Lightbody; all music is composed by Snow Patrol and Jacknife Lee, except "New York" by Snow Patrol, Lee and Johnny McDaid.

Fallen Empires track listing
No.	Title	Length
1.	"I'll Never Let Go"	4:44
2.	"Called Out in the Dark"	4:01
3.	"The Weight of Love"	4:16
4.	"This Isn't Everything You Are"	4:58
5.	"The Garden Rules"	4:29
6.	"Fallen Empires"	5:20
7.	"Berlin"	2:05
8.	"Lifening"	3:53
9.	"New York"	4:01
10.	"In the End"	4:00
11.	"Those Distant Bells"	3:17
12.	"The Symphony"	6:07
13.	"The President"	4:35
14.	"Broken Bottles Form a Star (Prelude)"	1:30

There was also a special digipak version of the album showing highlights of the band playing live at the Royal Albert Hall on 25 November 2009 on their 'Reworked' tour. The track listing is as follows:

First half highlights:

No.	Title	Length
1.	"Finish Line"
2.	"An Olive Grove Facing the Sea"
3.	"Give Me Strength"
4.	"You Could Be Happy"
5.	"Take Back the City"

Second half highlights:

No.	Title	Length
1.	"Dark Roman Wine"
2.	"Spitting Games"
3.	"Run"
4.	"Lifeboats"
5.	"The Planets Bend Between Us"
6.	"Chasing Cars"

== Personnel ==
Snow Patrol

- Gary Lightbody – vocals, guitar, backing vocals
- Nathan Connolly – guitar, backing vocals
- Paul Wilson – bass guitar, backing vocals
- Jonny Quinn – drums, percussion
- Tom Simpson – keyboards, samples
- Johnny McDaid – piano, guitar

Other personnel

- James "Big Jim" Anderson – tuba
- Stephen Wick – tuba
- John Barclay – trumpet
- Guy Barker – trumpet
- Pat White – trumpet
- Richard Bayliss – horns
- Evgeny Chebykin – horns
- Jocelyn Lightfoot – horns
- Timothy Brown – horns
- Kira Doherty – horns
- Philip Eastop – horns
- Avshalom Caspi – brass arrangement
- Ian Fasham – bass trombone
- David A. Stewart – bass trombone
- Dan Jenkins – trombone
- Colin Sheen – trombone
- Sam Bell – engineer, editing
- Tom McFall – engineer
- Philip Rose – engineer
- Tilmann Ilse – assistant engineer
- Karen Kelleher – assistant engineer
- Owen Lewis – assistant engineer
- James Jarvis – choir director
- John Ross – photography
- John C.F. Davis – mastering
- Hilary Skewes – contractor
- Cenzo Townshend – mixing
- Neil Comber – mixing assistant
- Dave Emery – mixing assistant
- Jacknife Lee – guitar, keyboards, programming, producer, glass harmonica, mixing
- Lissie – vocals

== Charts and certifications ==
=== Weekly charts ===
Weekly chart performance for Fallen Empires
Chart (2011–2012)	Peak position
Australian Albums (ARIA)	24
Austrian Albums (Ö3 Austria)	10
Belgian Albums (Ultratop Flanders)	4
Belgian Albums (Ultratop Wallonia)	9
Canadian Albums (Billboard)	2
Danish Albums (Hitlisten)	27
Dutch Albums (Album Top 100)	1
Finnish Albums (Suomen virallinen lista)	46
French Albums (SNEP)	70
German Albums (Offizielle Top 100)	3
Irish Albums (IRMA)	1
Italian Albums (FIMI)	67
Mexican Albums (AMPROFON)	90
New Zealand Albums (RMNZ)	27
Norwegian Albums (VG-lista)	40
Scottish Albums (Official Charts)	1
Spanish Albums (Promusicae)	65
Swiss Albums (Schweizer Hitparade)	6
UK Albums (Official Charts)	3
US Billboard 200	5
US Top Alternative Albums (Billboard)	2
US Digital Albums (Billboard)	3
US Top Rock Albums (Billboard)	2

=== Year-end charts ===
2011 year-end chart performance for Fallen Empires
Chart (2011)	Position
Dutch Albums (Album Top 100)	35
German Albums (Offizielle Top 100)	71
UK Albums (OCC)	40

2012 year-end chart performance for Fallen Empires
Chart (2012)	Position
Belgian Albums (Ultratop Flanders)	36
Belgian Albums (Ultratop Wallonia)	89
Dutch Albums (Album Top 100)	67
UK Albums (OCC)	132
US Top Rock Albums (Billboard)	74

=== Certifications ===
Certifications for Fallen Empires
Region	Certification	Certified units/sales
Belgium (BRMA)	Gold	15,000^{*}
Germany (BVMI)	Gold	100,000^{^}
Ireland (IRMA)	Platinum	15,000^{^}
Netherlands (NVPI)	Gold	25,000^{^}
United Kingdom (BPI)	Platinum	300,000^{*}
^{*} Sales figures based on certification alone.^{^} Shipments figures based on certification alone.
