= This Isn't Everything You Are =

Single by Snow Patrol

from the album Fallen Empires
- B-side: "Plastic Jesus"
- Released: 14 October 2011
- Recorded: 2011
- Genre: Rock
- Length: 4:57
- Label: Polydor
- Songwriter: Gary Lightbody
- Producer: Jacknife Lee

Snow Patrol singles chronology
| "Called Out in the Dark" (2011) | "This Isn't Everything You Are" (2011) | "New York" (2011) |

"This Isn't Everything You Are" is a song by Northern Irish alternative rock band Snow Patrol, released as the second single of their sixth album, Fallen Empires (2011) and was released as a digital download on 14 October 2011.

== Background and writing ==
The second single from their sixth album "Fallen Empires" is a lighter-in-the-air anthem that finds them returning to their traditional sound after the electronica elements of their previous single, "Called Out in the Dark." It was released on 14 October 2011.

Lightbody told Billboard magazine that he wrote the song "to try to protect" the three people experiencing difficulties, adding that he wanted, "to show them that there were people there for them whenever they needed. Sometimes it's hard to reach out, it's hard to ask for help. It's a recurring theme on the record."

The radio and video edit of the song excludes the lines "Is he worth all this, is it a simple yes? / Cause if you have to think, it's fucked / Feels like you loved him more, than he loved you / And you wish you’d never met."

== Critical reception ==
The song received favorable reviews from music critics. Mike Haydock from BBC Music wrote that it is a "great pop song, full of sparkle and warmth." Simon Gage from Daily Express expressed that "it's anthemic with big guitar breaks". While naming it an "arena rocker", Melissa Maerz from Entertainment Weekly also praised "moments like the gospel-choir chorus of the track", calling it "genuinely affecting." Andy Gill from The Independent also wrote a positive review, saying that "the uplifting title hook, a cross between Coldplay and Elbow, provides the album's most affecting moment." Dave Simpson of The Guardian called it "a doomed love song with a tragic twist."

The song was named the 'Best Track of the Year' by Dan Jenko of FMV Magazine.

== Music video ==
A music video to accompany the release of "This Isn't Everything You Are" was first released onto YouTube on 14 October 2011 at a total length of four minutes and twenty-two seconds. It contains footage filmed in Buenos Aires, Argentina. It was directed by Brett Simon and finds Snow Patrol becoming a house band.

== Track listing ==
Digital download
| No. | Title | Length |
|---|---|---|
| 1. | "This Isn't Everything You Are" (album version) | 4:57 |

UK 2-track Promo CD-single
| No. | Title | Length |
|---|---|---|
| 1. | "This Isn't Everything You Are" (radio edit) | 4:02 |
| 2. | "This Isn't Everything You Are" (instrumental) | 4:57 |

German 2-track Promo CD-single
| No. | Title | Length |
|---|---|---|
| 1. | "This Isn't Everything You Are" (radio edit) | 4:02 |
| 2. | "Plastic Jesus" | 3:31 |

== Chart performance ==
| Chart (2011) | Peak position |
|---|---|
| Belgium (Ultratip Bubbling Under Flanders) | 9 |
| Belgium (Ultratip Bubbling Under Wallonia) | 16 |
| Ireland (IRMA) | 18 |
| Netherlands (Single Top 100) | 42 |
| UK Singles (Official Charts) | 40 |
| US Adult Alternative Airplay (Billboard) | 21 |

== Release history ==
| Country | Release date | Format | Label |
|---|---|---|---|
| Netherlands | 14 October 2011 | Digital download | Polydor Records |
| United Kingdom | 14 October 2011 | Digital download | Polydor Records |
