= New York (Snow Patrol song) =

Single by Snow Patrol

from the album Fallen Empires
- Released: 20 December 2011
- Recorded: 2011
- Genre: Soft rock
- Length: 4:02
- Label: Polydor
- Songwriters: Gary Lightbody; Johnny McDaid
- Producer: Jacknife Lee

Snow Patrol singles chronology
"This Isn't Everything You Are" (2011)	"New York" (2011)	"In the End" (2012)

Music video
- "New York" on YouTube

"New York" is a song by Northern Irish alternative rock band Snow Patrol, released as the third single of their sixth album, Fallen Empires (2011). It was released as a digital download on 20 December 2011 in the US.

== Background and writing ==
Snow Patrol frontman Gary Lightbody struggled with writer's block when penning Fallen Empires. Speaking to Q magazine, the singer explained how a chance meeting with R.E.M. vocalist Michael Stipe at a Californian studio rejuvenated his writing process. He recalled, "I couldn't even write my name on a cheque. It was that bad at the time ... (Stipe arriving at the studio) was amazing because the first song I ever played live was R.E.M.'s 'Find the River' at a school concert." Although Stipe's input was minimal, it was enough to inspire Lightbody to rediscover his muse. He recalled, "Michael just made a few suggestions here and there. On a track called 'New York' there was a line, 'Your face has never left me.' He said, 'That sounds like you've got a girl's head in your bag.' So we changed that."

Lightbody explained the story behind the piano ballad: "I always try to write about personal experiences - 'New York' is about a girl I was seeing over there. We both had strong feelings for one another, but we were never in the same place at the same time. It's about missed opportunities." Lightbody penned this song with Snow Patrol pianist Johnny McDaid in his London studio.

== Promotion ==
The song was featured in Season 8 Episode 10 "Suddenly" of Grey's Anatomy, which aired on 5 January 2012. Snow Patrol performed it live on 9 January 2012 on American late-night talk show Late Show with David Letterman. This song was also featured in Season 4 Episode 10 "After School Special" of The Vampire Diaries, airing on January 17, 2013.

== Critical reception ==
Jon Young from Spin wrote that the somber "New York" calls out, "Come on / Come out / Come here," to a faraway lover with persuasive fervor. Mike Haydock from BBC Music wrote that "New York and In the End are the massive, sweeping songs that form the heart of Fallen Empires." Michael Tedder from Paste refers to "New York" as "a memorable melody, which will probably be in a million TV dramas". Chad Grischow from IGN Music calls it a power-ballad and "one of many instantly memorable offerings" on the album.

== Music video ==
The official music video was released on 30 March 2012. The video shows Gary Lightbody, the band's frontman sitting at a bar, lonely and looking upset, while having drink after drink. Scott Shetle of Diffuser.fm wrote: "Ignoring all the dancing and smiling faces around him, the frontman stares into space. His lip-synching is even half-hearted, as he's lost in thought about a relationship that didn't work out...The emotional video is simple but powerful."

== Chart performance ==
Chart performance for "New York"
Chart (2011–12)	Peak position
Belgium (Ultratip Bubbling Under Flanders)	16
Belgium (Ultratop 50 Wallonia)	37
Canada Hot 100 (Billboard)	94
US Bubbling Under Hot 100 (Billboard)	2
