= In the End (Snow Patrol song) =

Single by Snow Patrol

from the album Fallen Empires
- Released: 13 February 2012
- Recorded: 2011
- Genre: Alternative rock, power pop
- Length: 4:00
- Label: Polydor
- Songwriters: Gary Lightbody, Jonny Quinn, Nathan Connolly, Paul Wilson, Tom Simpson, Jacknife Lee

Snow Patrol singles chronology
"New York" (2011)	"In the End" (2012)	"Lifening" (2012)

"In the End" is a song by Northern Irish alternative rock band Snow Patrol, released as the fourth single of their sixth album, Fallen Empires (2011) and was released as a digital download on 13 February 2012.

== Music video ==
A music video to accompany the release of "In the End" was first released onto YouTube on 13 January 2012 at a total length of four minutes and thirteen seconds. It shows a man and woman dancing in 1930s clothing while Gary serenades on a stage. The video was supposedly inspired by MGM musicals. The video was directed by Brett Simon.

== Remixes ==
Two weeks after the music video release, UKF Dubstep, uploaded a Whateverman's remix of the original song on its YouTube channel.

== Charts ==
Chart performance for "In the End"
Chart (2012)	Peak position
Hungary (Rádiós Top 40)	35
Netherlands (Dutch Top 40)	35
US Adult Alternative Airplay (Billboard)	23
US Adult Pop Airplay (Billboard)	36
