= Lifening =

Single by Snow Patrol

from the album Fallen Empires
- Released: 3 July 2012
- Recorded: 2011
- Length: 3:30 (Burst to Life Mix); 3:53 (album version)
- Label: Polydor
- Songwriters: Gary Lightbody; Jacknife Lee
- Producer: Jacknife Lee

Snow Patrol singles chronology
"In the End" (2012)	"Lifening" (2012)	"The Lightning Strike (What If This Storm Ends?)" (2013)

"Lifening" is a song by Northern Irish alternative rock band Snow Patrol, released as the fifth single of their sixth album, Fallen Empires (2011). It was released as a free digital download on 3 July 2012 from their official website.

== Background and writing ==
In various interviews, Lightbody has stated that the song "Lifening" was written after his sister had children. He stated that he felt "his body clock" telling him that it was time to have children himself, and he has stated that the song is his way of trying to work out what he actually wants from life.

== Promotion ==
The single version of the song, Jacknife Lee's "Burst to Life Mix", received its worldwide first play on Radio 1's Review Show with Edith Bowman on 3 July 2012. Lightbody had originally stated that he thought the song would have a "soft" release.

== Music video ==
According to Lightbody's blog, the video for "Lifening" was filmed live during the band's live set at Chicago, as the song "has become a real live moment over the course of this year and we wanted to capture it".

== Charts ==
Chart performance for "Lifening"
Chart (2012)	Peak position
Belgium (Ultratip Bubbling Under Wallonia)	36
