= Called Out in the Dark =

Single by Snow Patrol

from the album Fallen Empires
- B-side: "Fallen Empires"; "My Brothers"; "I'm Ready"
- Released: 2 September 2011
- Recorded: 2011
- Studio: Topanga Canyon (Los Angeles)
- Genre: Alternative rock, electro-disco, alternative dance
- Length: 4:03
- Label: Polydor
- Songwriter: Gary Lightbody
- Producer: Jacknife Lee

Snow Patrol singles chronology
"An Olive Grove Facing the Sea" (2009)	"Called Out in the Dark" (2011)	"This Isn't Everything You Are" (2011)

Music video
- "Called Out in the Dark" on YouTube

"Called Out in the Dark" is a song by Northern Irish alternative rock band Snow Patrol, released on 2 September 2011 as the lead single of their sixth album, Fallen Empires (2011). It was made available both independently and on an EP with three other tracks from Fallen Empires. "Called Out in the Dark" was shortlisted for Meteor Choice Music Prize Irish Song of the Year 2011. A version of the track also exists which is remixed by Norman Cook.

== Background and writing ==
The song was written by the band's frontman Gary Lightbody and produced by Jacknife Lee, who worked on their previous three albums. It was recorded in Topanga Canyon in Los Angeles. The single premiered on Zane Lowe's Radio 1 show on July 21, 2011, and was released on September 2, 2011.

The song, along with other tracks on Fallen Empires, finds Snow Patrol venturing into dance territory. Lightbody told The Sun: "I've always DJed and dance music has always been a big part of our lives, but it's never really been part of the music. So we just let go a little bit this time."

== Composition ==
Beginning with an underlying, steady acoustic guitar riff that runs relentlessly throughout the track, quickly followed by a dancelike drumbeat which boldly kicks in alongside Gary Lightbody's distinct vocals declaring, 'it's like we just can't help ourselves cause we don't know how to back down.' "As the kids took back the parks," Lightbody sings, "You and I were left with the streets." The song builds momentum and reaches a climax with a striking, textured, electronic heavy chorus, 'we are listening and we are not blind, this is your life, this is your time.' The song aptly ends with the repeating guitar riff and its accompanying drum riff.

== Critical reception ==
The song received mostly mixed reviews from critics. Mike Haydock from BBC Music wrote that the song "is a pure mistake of style over substance: a song that has the traditional Snow Patrol shape, dominated by Gary Lightbody's vocal, but where the guitars have been binned just for the sake of it, just to try something 'new'. It sounds too try-hard and trite." Priya Elan from NME wrote a negative review of the track, saying that "it is wall-less, minimalist song in the worst sense of the word." He also criticized the chorus, writing that "is perhaps more disappointing than the verses, because it finds the band dropping the football stadium-like anthems for something that is not unlike the fey, coffee shop electronics that could be found on The Feeling's last album." He also commented about the vocal performance of the band's vocalist, writing that "as Lightbody goes into falsetto, he sounds like he's trying to do a blue-eyed, Will Young impression, but ends up sounding far too studied." Neil Ashman from Drowned in Sound wrote that "it would be a stretch to call the splashes of synth colour and buzzing basslines of ... 'Called Out in the Dark' anything more than cosmetic additions to tuneful, but unremarkable guitar pop."

A positive review came from Cherwell's Susan Yu, who wrote that "it is a delightful, electronica infused, powerful gem of a song." Simon Gage from Daily Star also wrote a positive review, saying that the song "has a slight bounce."

== Music video ==
A music video to accompany the release of "Called Out in the Dark" was first released onto YouTube on 17 August 2011 at a total length of four minutes and twenty-four seconds. With a dance choreographed by Noémie Lafrance, it features appearances by Tara Summers and Jack Davenport. Brett Simon directed the music video.

The music video, centered around a video shoot, sees Gary Lightbody (as stand-in), amongst dancers and the singer portrayed by Davenport, make a nuisance of himself on the set of the shoot. Lightbody tries hard to take part in the video and Tara Summers (director) precludes him from doing so. By the end of the video, the dancers are down to their underwear and Lightbody has grabbed a hold of the camera as it cranes out.

== Track listing ==
UK Digital download
No.	Title	Length
1.	"Called Out in the Dark"	4:03
2.	"Fallen Empires"	5:20
3.	"My Brothers"	3:32
4.	"I'm Ready"	3:23

German 2-track CD-single
No.	Title	Length
1.	"Called Out in the Dark"	4:03
2.	"My Brothers"	3:32

UK 2-track Promo CD-single
No.	Title	Length
1.	"Called Out in the Dark" (radio mix)	3:32
2.	"Called Out in the Dark" (instrumental)	4:02

== Chart performance ==
=== Weekly charts ===
Chart (2011–12)	Peak position
Australia (ARIA)	79
Austria (Ö3 Austria Top 40)	23
Belgium (Ultratop 50 Flanders)	7
Belgium (Ultratop 50 Wallonia)	10
Canada (Canadian Hot 100)	70
Denmark (Tracklisten)	35
Finland (Suomen virallinen lista)	20
Germany (GfK)	15
Hungary (Rádiós Top 40)	30
Ireland (IRMA)	5
Japan Hot 100 (Billboard)	91
Luxembourg (Billboard)	5
Netherlands (Dutch Top 40)	10
Netherlands (Single Top 100)	12
New Zealand (Recorded Music NZ)	35
Scotland Singles (Official Charts)	8
Switzerland (Schweizer Hitparade)	11
UK Singles (Official Charts)	11
US Billboard Hot 100	78
US Adult Alternative Airplay (Billboard)	5
US Adult Contemporary (Billboard)	27
US Adult Pop Airplay (Billboard)	15
US Alternative Airplay (Billboard)	36
US Hot Rock & Alternative Songs (Billboard)	37

=== Year-end charts ===
Chart (2011)	Position
Belgium (Ultratop Flanders)	52
Germany (Official German Charts)	74
Netherlands (Dutch Top 40)	75
UK Singles (Official Charts Company)	185

== Certifications ==
Region	Certification	Certified units/sales
Germany (BVMI)	Gold	150,000^{^}
United Kingdom (BPI)	Silver	200,000^{‡}
^{^} Shipments figures based on certification alone.^{‡} Sales+streaming figures based on certification alone.

== Release history ==
Country	Release date	Format	Label
United Kingdom	2 September 2011	Digital download	Polydor Records
