= Eyes Open Tour =

2006–07 concert tour by Snow Patrol

- Tour by Snow Patrol
- Poster advertising Snow Patrol's Australian Tour of September 2007
- Location: Asia; Australia; Europe; North America
- Associated album: Eyes Open
- Start date: 14 February 2006
- End date: 22 September 2007
- Legs: 14
- No. of shows: 218 (37 cancelled)

Snow Patrol concert chronology
- Final Straw Tour (2003–2005); Eyes Open Tour (2006–2007); Taking Back the Cities Tour (2008–2009)

The Eyes Open Tour was a concert tour by Northern Irish alternative rock band Snow Patrol in support of their fourth album, Eyes Open (2006). The band visited numerous international venues from 2006 through 2007. The tour is the collective name of many smaller tours and festivals Snow Patrol has played in support of their album. The tour officially commenced on 14 February 2006 with a "secret gig" called SG#3.

The tour saw the band visit continents like Europe, North America, Australia and Asia. The band headlined on almost all dates, and various acts supported them throughout. The tour was however, marred by cancellations mainly because of vocalist Gary Lightbody's throat problems and bassist Paul Wilson's shoulder injury. Additionally, other events happened with all other band members, but no dates were affected. Drummer Jonny Quinn broke his arm, but no shows were cancelled as Graham Hopkins pitched in to take up drumming duties. Keyboardist Tom Simpson was arrested for drug charges, but was released in time for the next concert. Guitarist Nathan Connolly sprained his ankle and foot, but sat through shows until the injury healed. The band visited countries like New Zealand and Mexico for the first time and played their first concert in Southeast Asia during the course of the tour. The Eyes Open Tour also introduced the Tour Reporter feature, where fans were given the chance of covering their local concert.

Snow Patrol finished the tour, which went on for a year and a half, in September 2007 in Australia. The full tour spanned 214 dates and had 37 cancellations.

== Tickets ==
=== Secret gigs and charity shows ===
Snow Patrol's official website initially offered tickets for the secret gig SG#3 to registered members on the forum. It was later announced that a limited number of tickets would be made available at Virgin Megastores, Royal Avenue, Belfast, Northern Ireland on 4 February 2006 at 9 am. Tickets for SG#4 were only available to members of Snow Patrol's official website through an e-mail which contained all details. Winners received a non-transferable SMS ticket to their mobile phones. This SMS message was deemed invalid if forwarded. Additionally, these mobile tickets were the only way into the concert.

Tickets for Nottingham's Rock City went on general sale via the Rock City Box Office on 5 May 2006. Tickets were priced at £22.50 each. The official website ran a pre-sale for members. During the North American Tour of February–April 2007, the band played an intimate show for friend Diana Gualda. Tickets for this show went on general sale on 8 February 1 pm (PST) via Ticketmaster. Tickets were priced at $30.

Tickets for the show at Live Earth were not available for general sale. Fans were required to register within a three-day period, starting 13 April 2007 at 12:00 pm. The winners were chosen through a ballot, and they received an SMS containing details on how to obtain their tickets. Each ticket was priced at £55. The official website held back a few tickets for its members, which were given out through a pre-sale.

One-off shows

Tickets for the show at KOKO were available for pre-sale from 25 January 2006, 9 am from Snow Patrol's official website for 24 hours and were limited to four tickets per person. The pre-sale password was posted on the forum half an hour before the sale. Any remaining tickets went on general sale on next morning from Gigsandtours and were priced £17.50. Later, the band's official website held a competition to give away the last two tickets. All 1,500 available tickets were sold out in less than ten minutes.

There were no tickets for the in-store performance at the Virgin Mega stores, Dublin. Entry to the concert required a wristband that could only be obtained from the store at 9 am on the day of the gig. They were given out on a first come first served basis. The official website held a last minute competition for members to give away the last 100 wristbands. Tickets for the one-off O_{2} concert went on sale 18 May 9 am and were priced at £25. They could be obtained from the Xfm Xchange, the Xfm Online Ticket Shop, Ticketmaster and Seetickets. For the secret O_{2} show, the band held back 1,000 tickets from general sale, and gave them away to the website members for free. Members were sent an e-mail containing details on how to win the tickets.

Festivals

Tickets for the Heineken Green Energy Festival went on sale on 10 February 2006 and could be purchased from Ticketmaster. They were priced at €34.50 each. Tickets for T on the Fringe went on general sale from 5 May 9 am and those for Marlay Park from 12 May at 9 am. Pre-sale of tickets for Marlay Park went on till 10 May. Tickets were priced at €44.50 and could be obtained from Ticketmaster. Fans, later, were also given the chance to win tickets through a competition where they were required to answer a question. A similar competition was also held to give away one ticket for T on the Fringe. It was later announced that more tickets were released, which could be obtained through Ticketmaster.

Tickets for the Eden Sessions were priced at £30 and were made available from Edenbookings. For Get Loaded in the Park, tickets were available through Ticketmaster. There was a special £20 early bird ticket scheme as promotion. Tickets for BBC Radio 1's Big Weekend were given out free via a draw through Radio 1's website. Tickets for Tennents ViTal went on general sale on 12 May 9 am. They could be obtained online from Vital06.com, by telephone or in person from Virgin and Ticketmaster outlets. Tickets for the Isle of Man Festival were available only through the Islands Box Office or could be purchased by phone. The tickets were priced at £32.50 each. Tickets for the Splendour in the Grass side-shows were available from Ticketek and Ticketmaster. Tickets for the Isle of Wight festival on 21 February 2006 via VirginRadio, and tickets were made available from usual ticket outlets like Ticketmaster 22 February 9 am. Tickets for T in the Park went on sale on 24 February 9 am. They could be purchased through Ticketmaster. Snow Patrol's official website held a competition to give away two tickets for T in the Park. Fans were required to create a video to the soundtrack of Signal Fire. Tickets for the V Festival went on general sale on 1 March 9 am. They could be purchased through Ticketmaster.

=== UK and Ireland tour, 2006 ===
Tickets for the UK and Ireland tour of 2006 went on general sale on 8 February 9 am and were priced at £17.50. Tickets could be obtained from Seetickets except for the Glasgow show which was through Ticketmaster. The Dublin date went on general sale 10 February, and tickets were priced at €34.50. Tickets could only be obtained from Ticketmaster. A competition was also held, where fans could enter and win tickets. The winners were announced through a draw. Tickets for the final dates at the Ulster Hall went on sale on 18 February, and were priced between £19.50 and £22.50. They could only be obtained from Ticketmaster. Additional tickets for the shows at The Forum were later released, which could be obtained through Seetickets. For the additional date at the Wembley Arena, the official website members were given the opportunity of a pre-sale. Tickets were priced at £23.50 (excluding booking fee). General sale began on 21 May 9 am, and tickets could be obtained through Ticketmaster and Seetickets. Later, extra seats for the 2 shows at Wembley were released. Tickets could be purchased from the venue's box office through phone or online, through Seetickets and Ticketmaster. After the Wembley date, another date for the Odyssey, Belfast was added. Tickets for this date went on sale on 22 August 9 am via Ticketmaster. When tickets for the show sold out within three hours, an additional date was announced. Tickets for this show were made available on 22 August, and could be obtained through Ticketmaster.

=== US tour, 2006 ===
Tickets for the seven-date US Tour of 2006 were made available through different online services like Ticketmaster, Ticketalternative, Ticketweb, through tickets for the San Francisco and Boston shows could be purchased on venue. General sale of tickets for the US Tour in May began on 8 April. Pre-sale, exclusively for members had begun a few days back. Pre-sales for later shows were held over the course of the next few months. General sale tickets could be obtained through Ticketmaster.

=== European tour, 2006 ===
Tickets for the Vienna, Utrecht and Zurich shows on the European Tour of 2006 went on general sale on 21 July and those for the Copenhagen show, and all the German, shows on 28 July. Again, members on the band's official website were given the opportunity to purchase tickets early via a pre-sale.

=== UK & Ireland Winter Arena Tour ===
Tickets for the UK & Ireland Winter Arena Tour went on pre-sale to website members on 10 May 9 am and continued till 12 May 9 am. Tickets were limited to a maximum of 4 per household. General sale began as soon as the pre-sale ended. For the additional Wembley date, which was later added, the official website ran a pre-sale where tickets were priced at £23.50 each. General sale began on 21 May 9 am. Tickets could be obtained through Ticketmaster and Seetickets. For the added Scottish show, the website ran a pre-sale exclusively for members. Tickets went on general sale on 14 July 9 am. They could be obtained from Ticketmaster and Seetickets. The tickets were priced at £22.50 each. For the show at Bournemouth, the official website ran a pre-sale for members on 14 July 9 am. The pre-sale ended as soon as tickets went up for general sale, which began on 17 July 9 am. Tickets could be obtained through Ticketmaster and Seetickets and were priced at £22.50. Tickets for the Manchester show went on general sale on 20 October 9 am. Tickets could be obtained through Seetickets, and were priced at £23.50 each. The tickets for this show sold out in 38 minutes, so another show was added. The other Manchester show's tickets were made available for general sale on 20 October. They could be obtained through Seetickets and Ticketmaster, and were priced at £24.00 each. Extra tickets for select dates were released after the tour had begun, which could only be purchased online. For the show at The Point, tickets went on general sale on 22 August 9 am, and could be obtained through Ticketmaster.

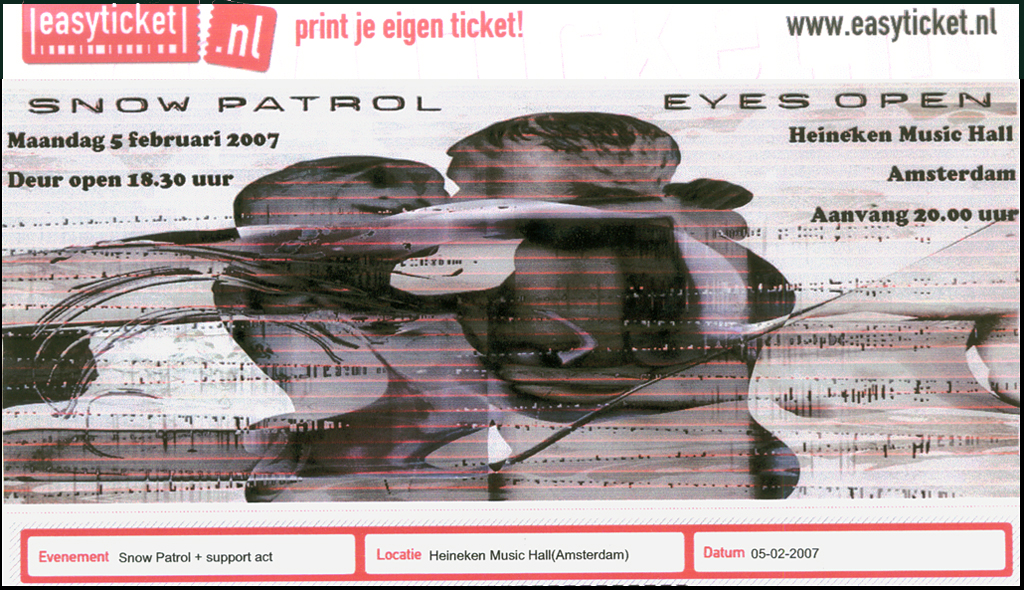
Ticket for the concert at the Heineken Music Hall on 5 February 2007

European Tour, 2007

Tickets for the European Tour, which saw the band playing in Germany went on sale on 20 November 9 am via Kartenhaus.de. An additional Dutch date was later added, and tickets for the show went on general sale on 25 November 9 am (CET). Tickets for the show could be obtained from Easyticket.nl.

=== Australian tour, February 2007 ===
Tickets for the Australian tour of 2007 went on pre-sale on 21 November and continued for a day. General sale began on 23 November and tickets could be obtained through Ticketek and Ticketmaster. For the New Zealand dates, the pre-sale began on 6 December 9 am (NZDT). General sale began on 8 December and tickets were made available through Ticketmaster. Tickets for the second North American Tour went on pre-sale for website members. General sale began on 17 and 18 November, depending on the concert dates. Additional tickets for the Melbourne date were later released on 17 January 2007 at 9 am. More tickets were released on 19 January at 9 am. Tickets could be obtained through Ticketmaster.

=== North American tour, February–April 2007 ===
Tickets for the tour went on general sale on 17 and 18 November 2006. Snow Patrol's official website members were given a pre-sale opportunity. A show in Chicago was announced later, and tickets for this show went on general sale on 2 December 12 pm (CST), and could be obtained through Ticketmaster. A few days before, the official website held a pre-sale for its members. Shows in Portland, Houston, Denver and Washington, D.C. were later added. Tickets for the Portland, Denver and Washington shows went on general sale on 9 December 10 am and those for Houston on 8 December 5 pm. Three dates for Seattle, Universal City and San Francisco were later added. Tickets for these shows went on pre-sale for the official website members. General sale began on 16 and 17 December. Tickets could be obtained through Ticketmaster.

=== Japanese tour, April 2007 ===
Tickets for the Japanese tour went on pre-sale exclusively for members of the band's official website on 1 September and continued till 4 September. General sale of tickets started on 16 September, which could be obtained from Eplus.jp. After the shows were rescheduled, tickets for the new dates went on general sale 23 December. Tickets for the original shows were deemed valid for each revised date, and an option of a refund was offered.

=== North American tour, July–August 2007 ===
This leg of the tour saw the band play in Mexico for the first time. Tickets for this show went on sale on 28 January, were priced at 350 pesos, and could be obtained through Ticketmaster.

=== Australian tour, September 2007 ===
The final leg of the tour was in Australia and New Zealand. Tickets for the Australian dates went on sale on 15 June via Ticketek. A pre-sale was held before the said date for website members. To add to it, the band offered a copy of Final Straw for every purchased ticket. Tickets for the New Zealand shows 18 July via Ticketek and Ticketmaster. Members again were given the chance of getting tickets early via a pre-sale.

== Secret gigs ==
To generate buzz about the then upcoming album, Snow Patrol played a secret gig in Belfast in mid-February. The show was dubbed SG#3. Later, Snow Patrol's official website announced another secret gig, dubbed SG#4, in conjunction with Vodafone as part of their "To Be Announced" feature. It was held at the Royal Opera House in London on 26 April 2:30 pm. Snow Patrol debuted three new songs for the 200-strong crowd: "Hands Open", "Chasing Cars" and "Make This Go on Forever". The concert was later shown on E4 the same weekend and Channel 4 on 5 May 11 pm.

Tour dates

Date	City	Country	Venue
14 February 2006	Belfast	Northern Ireland	Mandela Hall
26 April 2006	London	England	Royal Opera House

Set list

1. "Wow"
2. "Hands Open"
3. "Chocolate"
4. "It's Beginning to Get to Me"
5. "Spitting Games"
6. "Headlights on Dark Roads"
7. "Grazed Knees"
8. "Chasing Cars"
9. "An Olive Grove Facing the Sea"
10. "Shut Your Eyes"
11. "How to Be Dead"
12. "Make this Go on Forever"
13. "Ways and Means"
14. "Run"
15. "You're All I Have"

Encore

16. "Open Your Eyes"
17. "Tiny Little Fractures"
- Set list at SG#3.

Set list

1. "Wow"
2. "Chocolate"
3. "It's Beginning to Get to Me"
4. "Spitting Games"
5. "Hands Open"
6. "Shut Your Eyes"
7. "Chasing Cars"
8. "How to Be Dead"
9. "The Finish Line"
10. "Run"
11. "You’re All I Have"
- Set list at SG#4.

== European Tour (Leg I) ==
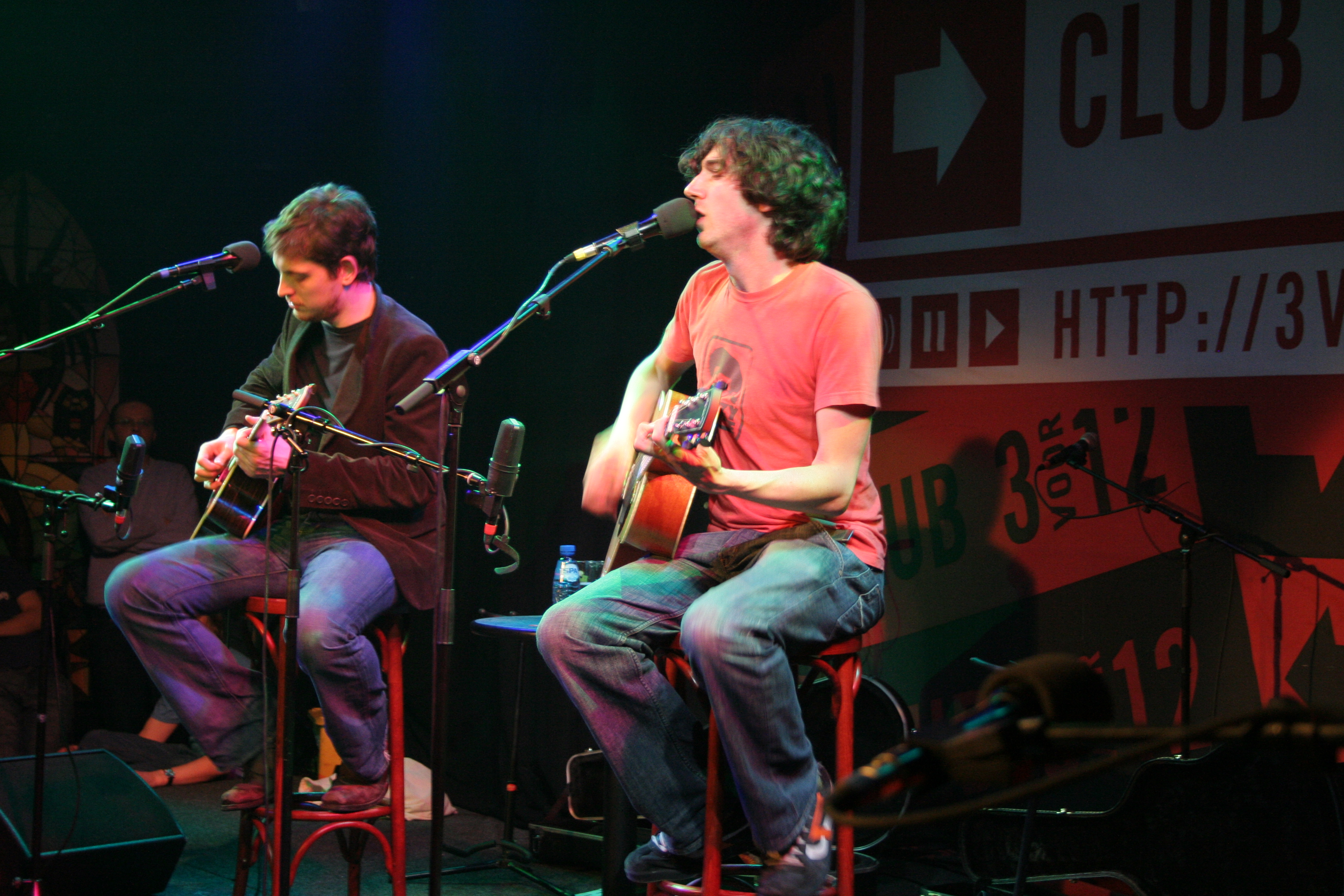
Nathan Connolly and Gary Lightbody in session for 3VOOR12 on 8 March 2006.

After the secret gigs and the KOKO show, Snow Patrol kicked off touring for Eyes Open by undertaking a small European tour. The tour included an acoustic show by Lightbody and Connolly for Dutch channel 3VOOR12.

Tour dates

Date	City	Country	Venue
28 February 2006	Madrid	Spain	Caracol
2 March 2006	Brussels	Belgium	Forest National (Headliner: Deus)
4 March 2006	Copenhagen	Denmark	Vega Jr.
6 March 2006	Cologne	Germany	Stadtgarden
7 March 2006	Amsterdam	Netherlands	The Melkweg
8 March 2006	Amsterdam	Netherlands	Club 3VOOR12
10 March 2006	Paris	France	Nouveau Casino

== US Tour (Leg I) ==
After the European Tour winded, the band headed to the United States to play a further 7 dates. One of these dates was at the SXSW Festival. Though the tour was called US Tour, it included a lone date in Canada. During the tour, the band played an intimate session for AOL Music in Manhattan. This performance was later released as a live EP on the iTunes Store as sessions@AOL.

Tour dates

Date	City	Country	Venue
15 March 2006	Atlanta	United States	The Loft
20 March 2006	San Francisco	United States	Great American Music Hall
22 March 2006	Los Angeles	United States	The Troubadour
25 March 2006	Boston	United States	Paradise Rock Club
28 March 2006	New York City	United States	Bowery Ballroom
30 March 2006	Toronto	Canada	The Mod Club

== UK & Ireland Tour ==
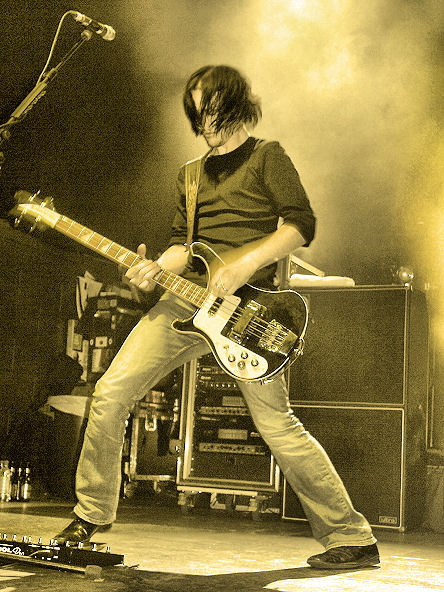
Paul Wilson at The ABC on 1 May 2006.

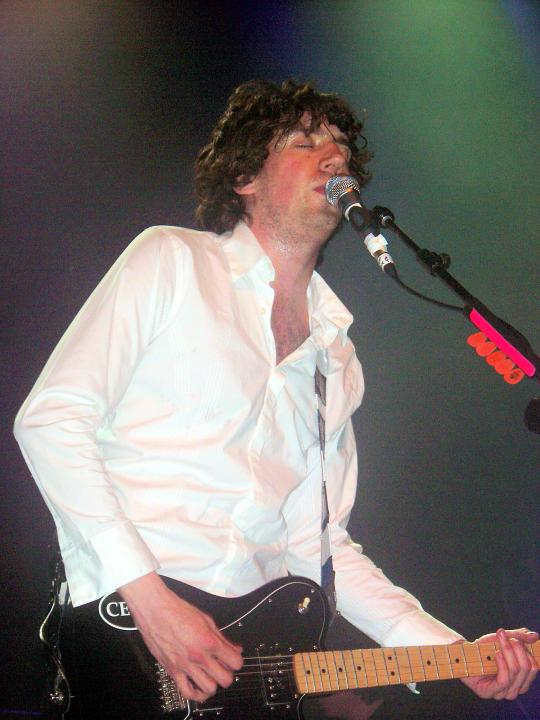
Gary Lightbody at The Forum on 5 May 2006.

Snow Patrol undertook a short UK & Ireland Tour to coincide with the release of Eyes Open on 1 May. The tour began at Dublin Castle (at the Heineken Green Energy Festival) and was to finish with two nights at The Forum, London. But due to tickets selling out quickly and the success of SG#3, an additional date was added at the Ulster Hall. Later, support acts were confirmed. A news item on the official website said that the band intended to include different acts on different dates.

Tour dates

Date	City	Country	Venue	Support act(s)
1 May 2006	Glasgow	Scotland	The ABC	The Cinematics & The Ghears
2 May 2006	Manchester	England	The Ritz	Fields & The Ghears
3 May 2006	Cardiff	Wales	Cardiff University	The Spinto Band & The Ghears
5 May 2006	London	England	The Forum	Deus & The Ghears
6 May 2006	London	England	The Forum	Amusement Parks on Fire
8 May 2006	Belfast	Northern Ireland	Ulster Hall	Red Organ Serpent Sound & Desert Hearts

== US Tour (Leg II) ==
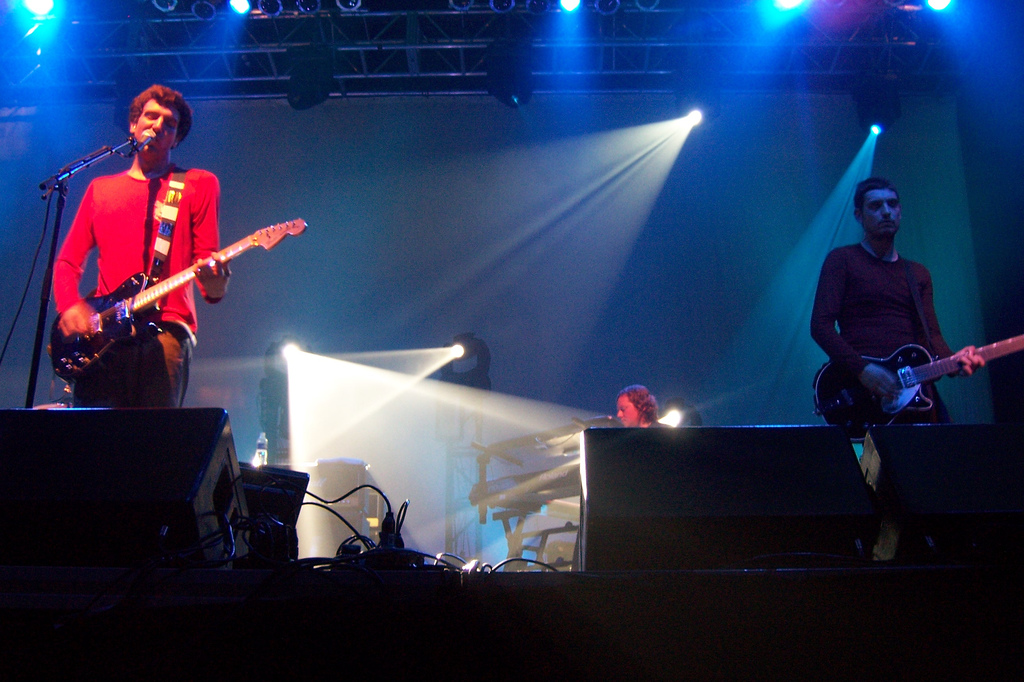
Snow Patrol at the Roseland Ballroom on 8 September 2006.

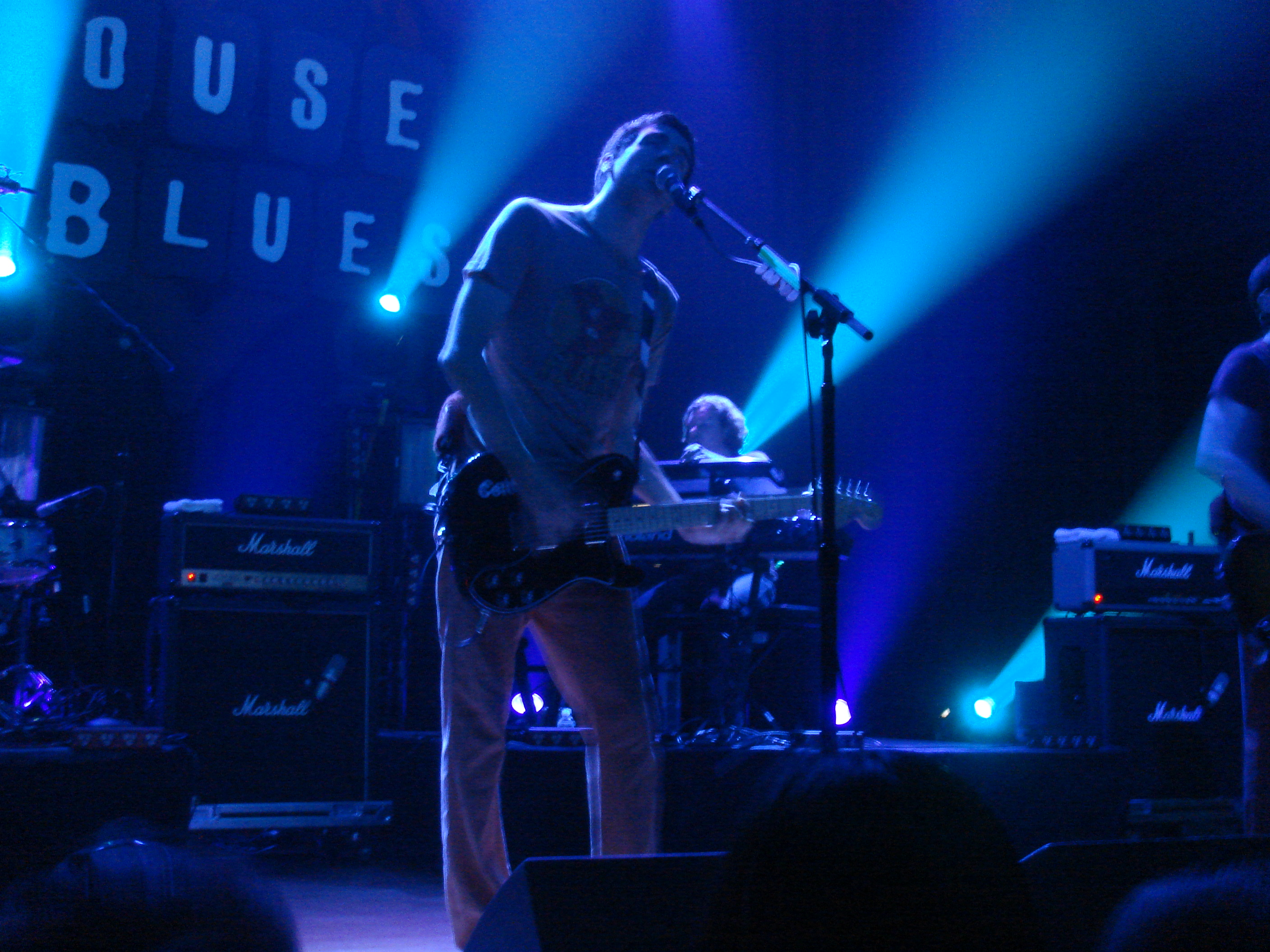
Snow Patrol at the House of Blues on 28 September 2006.

Snow Patrol next did a month-long tour of US and Canada, following a hugely successful SXSW appearance and a sold out US Tour in March. The Duke Spirit and Augustana were booked as support acts. The tour included an in-store performance at HMV to kick off the Canadian dates. An autograph session was held after the set. The band chose Denver specifically to be the location of the first concert. They had kept the city as a surprise location on a previous tour two years before and had visited there for the first time, expect lukewarm reaction. However, the concert sold out and the band had made it a point to return in the future.

A few shows were initially cancelled as vocalist Gary Lightbody's voice had worn out. He was advised by his doctor to take a week's rest before the tour as he had developed laryngitis (polyps on vocal cords), but he preferred not to because of the pre-booked tour. Tests later showed that Lightbody's voice had not healed at all, he had lost his top range, and the band was forced to cancel all remaining shows. The cancelled shows were rescheduled to the end of the tour. Lightbody credited the band's agent and managers for their quick work.

However, the first two rescheduled shows had to be cancelled as part of the band couldn't get flight tickets to the US due to flight delays caused by the Heathrow Terrorist Plot. Connolly and Simpson made it to the US, but the rest of the band couldn't. Later, a whole new set of dates was announced with two additional radio shows. After getting his voice back, Lightbody gave up drinking on tour in order to preserve his voice, on advice on his doctor (who also works with pop singer Celine Dion). Although he felt ashamed of it before, he hired a vocal coach after finding that Johnny Rotten had one when he was a Sex Pistol. He also started to do vocal warm-ups before shows, and requested a separate area for him to do his exercises, away from "the band laughing at [him]."

Augustana returned as the support act for all rescheduled shows, and Martha Wainwright, who had previously worked with the band for the song "Set the Fire to the Third Bar", supported the band on a select few dates. On 29 August, the band appeared as musical guests on The Tonight Show. The band performed "Chasing Cars", which was #6 on the singles chart in the United States then.

Tour dates

Date	City	Country	Venue
Support acts: The Duke Spirit & Augustana
23 May 2006	Denver	United States	Paramount Theatre
25 May 2006	Dallas	United States	The Granada Theater
26 May 2006	Austin	United States	Stubb's B-B-Q
27 May 2006	Houston	United States	Verizon Wireless Theater
~~29 May 2006~~	~~Atlanta~~	~~United States~~	~~Roxy Theatre~~ (CANCELLED)
~~31 May 2006~~	~~Washington, D.C.~~	~~United States~~	~~9:30 Club~~ (CANCELLED)
~~2 June 2006~~	~~Boston~~	~~United States~~	~~The Avalon~~ (CANCELLED)
~~3 June 2006~~	~~New York City~~	~~United States~~	~~Roseland Ballroom~~ (CANCELLED)
~~5 June 2006~~	~~Philadelphia~~	~~United States~~	~~Electric Factory~~ (CANCELLED)
~~6 June 2006~~	~~Montreal~~	~~Canada~~	~~Quebec Metropolis Centre~~ (CANCELLED)
~~7 June 2006~~	~~Toronto~~	~~Canada~~	~~Kool Haus~~ (CANCELLED)
~~9 June 2006~~	~~Pontiac~~	~~United States~~	~~Clutch Cargo's~~ (CANCELLED)
~~10 June 2006~~	~~Chicago~~	~~United States~~	~~The Vic Theatre~~ (CANCELLED)
~~11 June 2006~~	~~Minneapolis~~	~~United States~~	~~First Avenue~~ (CANCELLED)
~~13 June 2006~~	~~Vancouver~~	~~Canada~~	~~HMV in Robson Street~~ (CANCELLED)
~~14 June 2006~~	~~Vancouver~~	~~Canada~~	~~Commodore Ballroom~~ (CANCELLED)
~~15 June 2006~~	~~Seattle~~	~~United States~~	~~Paramount Theatre~~ (CANCELLED)
~~16 June 2006~~	~~Portland~~	~~United States~~	~~Roseland Theater~~ (CANCELLED)
~~18 June 2006~~	~~San Francisco~~	~~United States~~	~~The Warfield~~ (CANCELLED)
~~19 June 2006~~	~~Los Angeles~~	~~United States~~	~~The Wiltern LG~~ (CANCELLED)
~~20 June 2006~~	~~Los Angeles~~	~~United States~~	~~The Wiltern LG~~ (CANCELLED)
~~22 June 2006~~	~~Atlanta~~	~~United States~~	~~The Tabernacle~~ (CANCELLED)
~~23 June 2006~~	~~Washington, D.C.~~	~~United States~~	~~9:30 Club~~ (CANCELLED)
~~25 June 2006~~	~~Toronto~~	~~Canada~~	~~Kool Haus~~ (CANCELLED)
~~26 June 2006~~	~~Philadelphia~~	~~United States~~	~~Electric Factory~~ (CANCELLED)
~~27 June 2006~~	~~New York City~~	~~United States~~	~~Roseland Ballroom~~ (CANCELLED)
Rescheduled tour starts
~~12 August 2006~~	~~Auburn~~	~~United States~~	~~White River Amphitheatre~~ (CANCELLED)
~~13 August 2006~~	~~Portland~~	~~United States~~	~~Tom McCall Waterfront Park~~ (CANCELLED)
12 August 2006	Seattle	~~United States~~	KNDD 107.7 FM
13 August 2006	Portland	~~United States~~	KNRK 94.7 FM
15 August 2006	Boston	~~United States~~	Bank of America Pavilion
Support act: Augustana
6 September 2006	Atlanta	United States	The Tabernacle
Support acts: Augustana & Martha Wainwright
8 September 2006	New York City	United States	Roseland Ballroom
Support act: Augustana
9 September 2006	Philadelphia	United States	Electric Factory
10 September 2006	Washington, D.C.	United States	9:30 Club
12 September 2006	Montreal	Canada	Quebec Metropolis Centre
13 September 2006	Toronto	Canada	Kool Haus
14 September 2006	Detroit	United States	Clutch Cargo's
16 September 2006	Chicago	United States	Riviera Theatre
17 September 2006	Minneapolis	United States	First Avenue
20 September 2006	Seattle	United States	Moore Theatre
21 September 2006	Vancouver	Canada	PNE Forum
23 September 2006	Portland	United States	Roseland Theater
24 September 2006	San Francisco	United States	The Warfield
Support acts: Augustana & Martha Wainwright
26 September 2006	Los Angeles	United States	The Wiltern LG
27 September 2006	Los Angeles	United States	The Wiltern LG
Support act: Augustana
28 September 2006	San Diego	United States	House of Blues
30 September 2006	Las Vegas	United States	The Joint

== European Tour (Leg II) ==
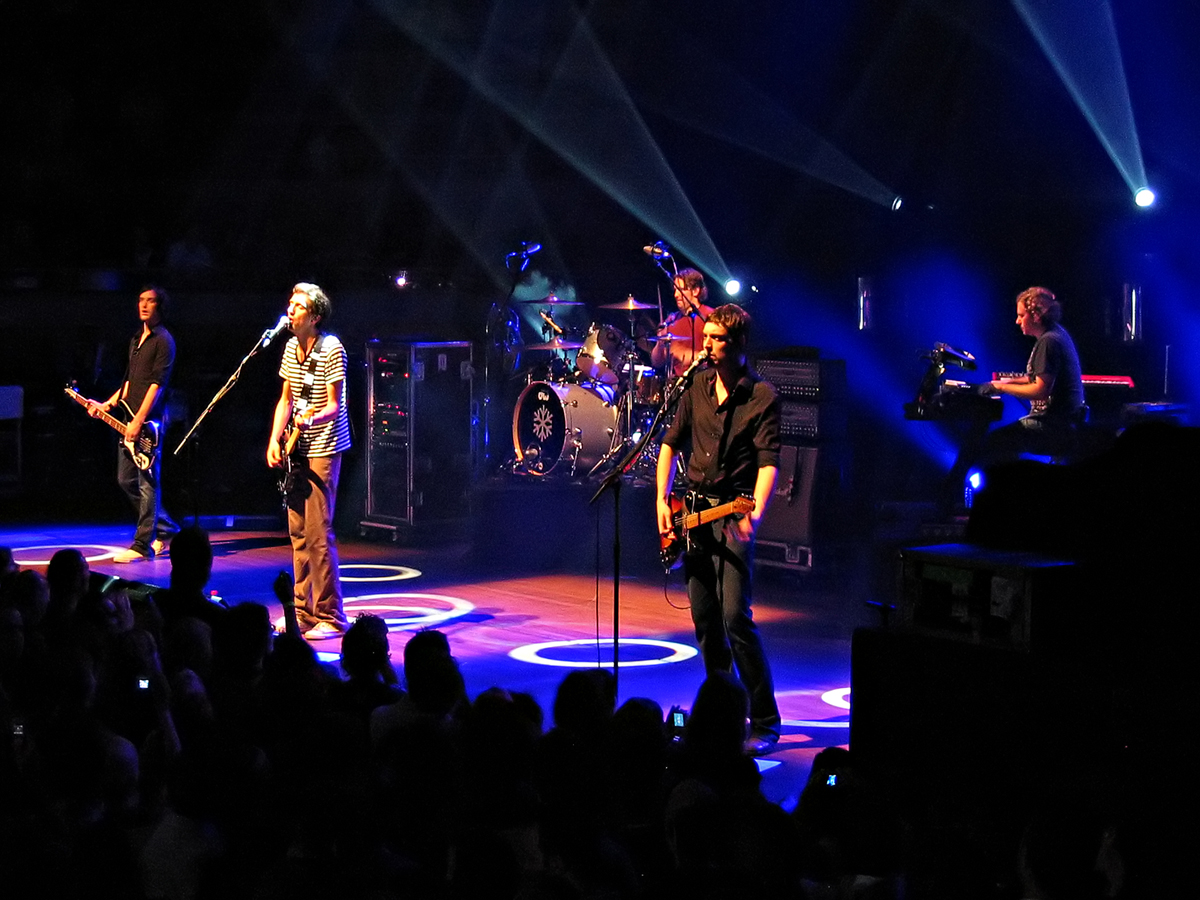
Snow Patrol at the Muziekcentrum Vredenburg on 11 October 2006.

In October, Snow Patrol embarked on a second European Tour. The tour saw them visit countries like Norway, Denmark, Switzerland, Austria, Germany and France. Artists like The Cinematics, Declan O'Rourke, Asyl and Joseph D'Anvers supported the band throughout the tour on different dates. Midway through the tour, bassist Paul Wilson injured his left arm and shoulder. He was having a little muscle strain, but he ignored the pain and carried on playing. It then built up and became too much for him to play on-stage. As a result, four French and two German shows were cancelled.

Tour dates

Date	City	Country	Venue
Support act: The Cinematics
8 October 2006	Oslo	Norway	Rockefeller Music Hall
9 October 2006	Copenhagen	Denmark	Vega House of Music
Support acts: The Cinematics & Declan O'Rourke
10 October 2006	Cologne	Germany	E-Werk
11 October 2006	Utrecht	Netherlands	Muziekcentrum Vredenburg
13 October 2006	Hamburg	Germany	Markthalle
14 October 2006	Berlin	Germany	Huxley's Neue Welt
15 October 2006	Vienna	Austria	Outdoor Arena
16 October 2006	München	Germany	Elserhalle
18 October 2006	Zürich	Switzerland	Rohstofflager
Support acts: Asyl & Joseph D'Anvers
19 October 2006	Seichamps	France	Espace Culturel
20 October 2006	Lyon	France	Pont Transbordeur
22 October 2006	Marseille	France	Le Moulin
23 October 2006	Ramonville	France	Salle des Fêtes
~~25 October 2006~~	~~Hérouville-Saint-Clair~~	~~France~~	~~Big Band Cafe~~ (CANCELLED)
~~26 October 2006~~	~~Paris~~	~~France~~	~~Élysée Montmartre~~ (CANCELLED)
~~27 October 2006~~	~~Nantes~~	~~France~~	~~L'Olympic~~ (CANCELLED)
~~29 October 2006~~	~~Lille~~	~~France~~	~~Le Grand Mix~~ (CANCELLED)
Support acts: The Cinematics & Declan O'Rourke
~~1 November 2006~~	~~Bielefeld~~	~~Germany~~	~~Ringlokschuppen~~ (CANCELLED)
~~2 November 2006~~	~~Ludwigshafen~~	~~Germany~~	~~DasHaus~~ (CANCELLED)

== UK & Ireland Winter Arena Tour ==
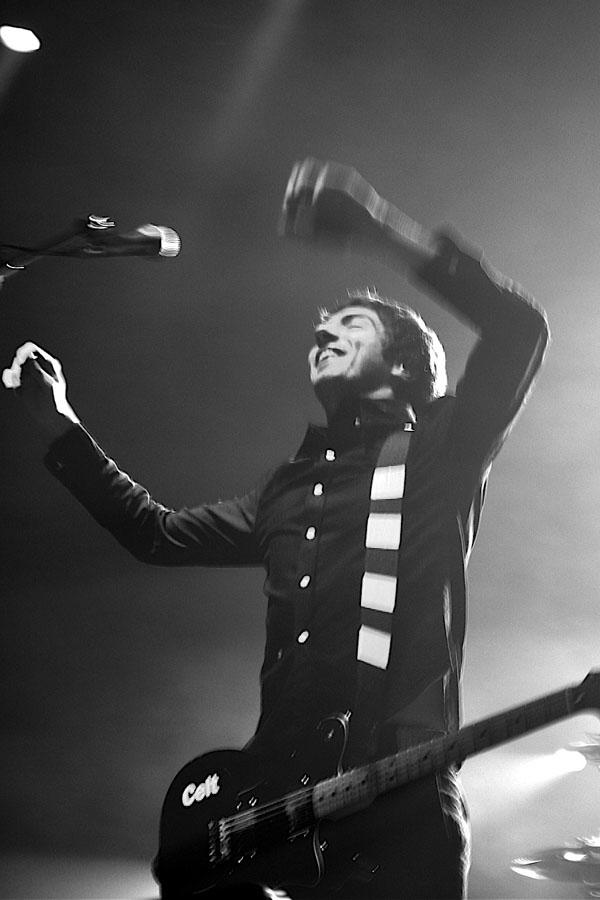
Gary Lightbody at the SECC on 16 December 2006.

Snow Patrol embarked on a tour of the UK & Ireland in winter 2006, which they headlined. They were supported on by a number of support acts. The tour kicked off in late November and continued till the end of December. The tour included shows at the historic Point Theatre in Dublin. The tour was played in two legs. Midway thorough the tour, the band headed to the US to play some radio shows.

Martha Wainwright was replaced as female lead vocalist for "Set the Fire to the Third Bar" because of her commitments in the studio. Lisa Hannigan, who had previously worked with Gary Lightbody on the song "Some Surprise" for the charity album The Cake Sale, and Miriam Kaufmann, longtime friend of the band joined the band on tour as touring members, singing female vocals on the song for one half of the tour each. Iain Archer and Declan O'Rourke were recruited to play acoustic guitar, with Lightbody praising them as two of the best guitar players and two of the most favorite people the band had ever met. Ben Dumville and Colm MacAthlaoich played trumpet on "An Olive Grove Facing the Sea", as they'd always done. The tour saw the band play a 21-song set, which included the band's first release "Starfighter Pilot".

Tour dates

Date	City	Country	Venue	Support act(s)
Leg I
26 November 2006	Bournemouth	England	Bournemouth International Centre	Young Knives
28 November 2006	Birmingham	England	National Indoor Arena	Young Knives & Fields
29 November 2006	Manchester	England	Manchester Evening News Arena	Young Knives & The Crimea
30 November 2006	Newcastle upon Tyne	England	Metro Radio Arena	Young Knives & The Crimea
Leg II
14 December 2006	Manchester	England	G-MEX Centre	Elbow and Air Traffic
15 December 2006	Manchester	England	G-MEX Centre	Elbow and Our Lunar Activities
16 December 2006	Glasgow	Scotland	Scottish Exhibition and Conference Centre	Elbow & Air Traffic
18 December 2006	London	England	Wembley Arena	Elbow & Fields
19 December 2006	London	England	Wembley Arena	Guillemots & The Crimea
21 December 2006	Belfast	Northern Ireland	Odyssey Arena	The Frames & The Duke Special
22 December 2006	Dublin	Ireland	Point Theatre	Director & The Duke Special
23 December 2006	Dublin	Ireland	Point Theatre	Declan O'Rourke & The Duke Special

Typical set list

1. "Spitting Games"
2. "Wow"
3. "Chocolate"
4. "It's Beginning to Get to Me"
5. "Headlights on Dark Roads"
6. "Starfighter Pilot"
7. "How to Be Dead"
8. "You are My Joy"
9. "Grazed Knees"
10. "Chasing Cars"
11. "Shut Your Eyes"
12. "An Olive Grove Facing the Sea"
13. "Set the Fire to the Third Bar"
14. "Somewhere a Clock is Ticking"
15. "Make this Go on Forever"
16. "Ways and Means"
17. "Run"
18. "You're All I Have"

Encore

19. "The Finish Line"
20. "Open Your Eyes"
21. "Tiny Little Fractures"

== US Christmas radio shows ==
In the middle of the Winter Arena Tour, Snow Patrol headed to the United States to play a few radio shows. They resumed the second leg of the Winter Arena Tour after finishing playing on these shows.

Tour dates

Date	City	Country	Venue	Notes
3 December 2006	Portland	United States	Crystal Ballroom	KNRK – December to Remember (Support: Tea for Julie)
5 December 2006	Denver	United States	Fillmore Auditorium	KTCL – Not So Silent Night
7 December 2006	Seattle	United States	KeyArena	KNDD – Deck the Hall Ball
9 December 2006	Seattle	United States	—	Aired on KBKS-FM 106.1 FM
10 December 2006	Los Angeles	United States	Gibson Amphitheatre	KROQ – Almost Acoustic Christmas

== European Tour (Leg III) ==
Snow Patrol kicked off touring for 2007 by doing a short, four date tour of Germany. An additional date in Amsterdam was added later.

Ahead of the tour, drummer Jonny Quinn broke his arm in a snowboarding accident in the French Alps. The band had to cancel several of their shows before on the tour when bassist Paul Wilson injured his arm and shoulder and when vocalist Gary Lightbody developed laryngitis and lost his voice. Not wanting to cancel shows, the band recruited longtime friend Graham Hopkins to replace Quinn. Hopkins got one rehearsal to learn his drum parts before the tour dates began. Quinn was expected to return for the Australian Tour, but however, his injuries healed in time for the North American tour which started late February 2007.

Tour dates

Date	City	Country	Venue
4 February 2007	Offenbach	Germany	Stadthalle Offenbach
5 February 2007	Amsterdam	Netherlands	Heineken Music Hall
6 February 2007	Düsseldorf	Germany	Tor 3 Club
8 February 2007	Stuttgart	Germany	Theaterhaus
9 February 2007	Berlin	Germany	Columbiahalle

== Australian Tour (Leg I) ==
Snow Patrol played a short, three-date tour of Australia in mid-February. They were supported by Australian bands Howling Bells and Red Riders. The shows were Snow Patrol's largest Australian shows then.

To celebrate the album reaching #1 in New Zealand, the band added a date for New Zealand on the tour. This show became their first ever in the country. Hopkins continued to drum on this tour for the still injured Quinn.

Tour dates

Date	City	Country	Venue
Support acts: Howling Bells & Red Riders
17 February 2007	Perth	Australia	Belvoir Amphitheatre
19 February 2007	Sydney	Australia	Hordern Pavilion
20 February 2007	Melbourne	Australia	Festival Hall
22 February 2007	Auckland	New Zealand	Trusts Stadium

== North American Tour (Leg I) ==
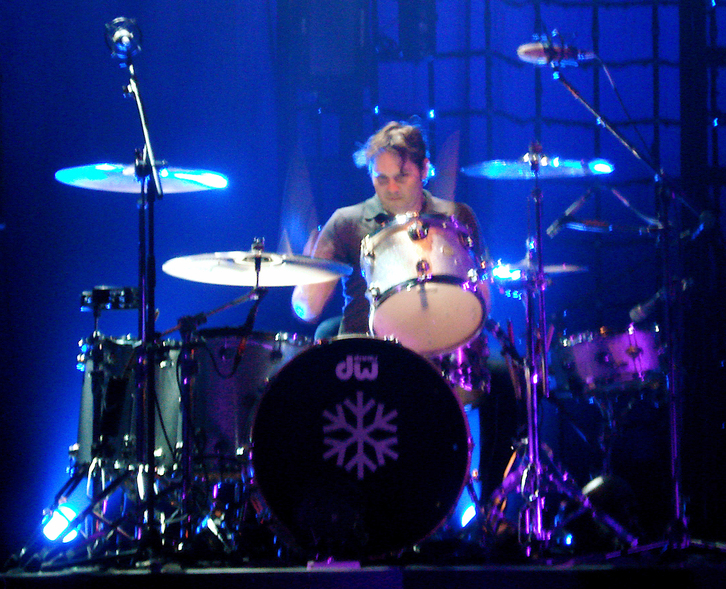
Jonny Quinn at the BankUnited Center on 19 March 2007.

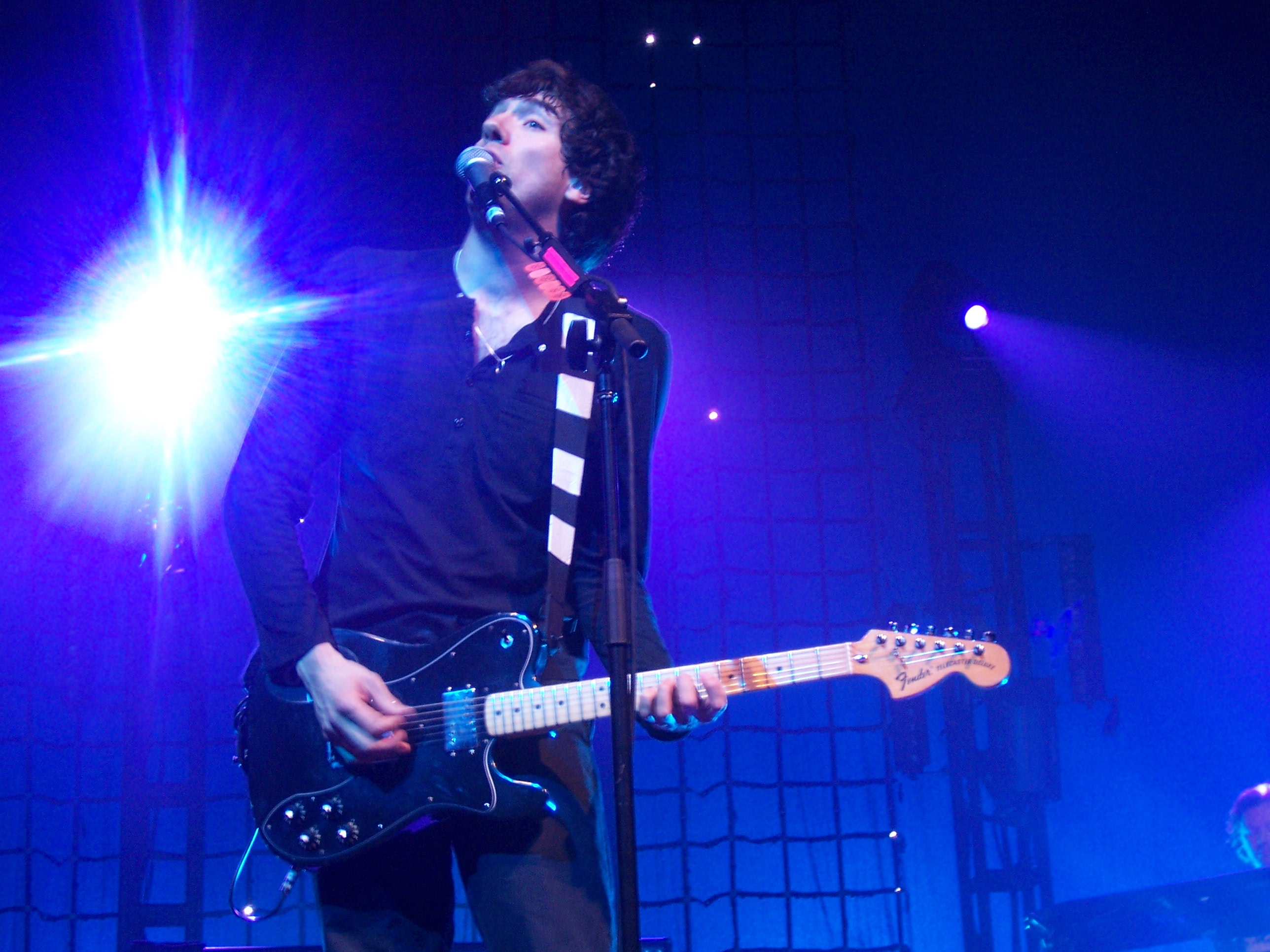
Gary Lightbody at the WaMu Theatre on 27 March 2007.

After the Australian tour, Snow Patrol headlined a North American Tour. Support acts for all shows were OK Go and Silversun Pickups. The tour schedule had them covering various cities in the United States, playing a few dates in Canada and playing their first ever show in Mexico. The Mexican show, though had to be cancelled as the band was unaware of the 48-hour wait to get their equipment through customs. The show was rescheduled to 26 July.

Quinn returned to resume drumming duties on this tour. Midway through the tour however, lead guitarist Nathan Connolly badly sprained his foot and ankle. Though it was not possible for him to put any weight on his foot, the management assured fans that no shows would be cancelled and Connolly would most likely be sitting in the shows. The tour began in February end and continued till mid-April, after which the band headed to Japan to play shows that had been rescheduled from February.

Tour dates

Date	City	Country	Venue
Support acts: OK Go & Silversun Pickups
26 February 2007	Portland	United States	Memorial Coliseum
27 February 2007	Seattle	United States	KeyArena
1 March 2007	San Francisco	United States	Bill Graham Civic Auditorium
2 March 2007	Los Angeles	United States	Gibson Amphitheatre
3 March 2007	San Diego	United States	Cox Arena @ San Diego State University
5 March 2007	Magna	United States	Salt Air Theatre
6 March 2007	Denver	United States	Fillmore Auditorium
8 March 2007	Tulsa	United States	Cain's Ballroom
9 March 2007	Grand Prairie	United States	Nokia Theatre at Grand Prairie
10 March 2007	Austin	United States	Stubb's B-B-Q
11 March 2007	Houston	United States	Verizon Wireless Theater
~~14 March 2007~~	~~Mexico City~~	~~Mexico~~	~~Teatro Metropólitan~~ (CANCELLED)
19 March 2007	Coral Gables	United States	BankUnited Center
20 March 2007	Orlando	United States	Hard Rock Live
21 March 2007	Duluth	United States	Arena at Gwinnett Center
23 March 2007	Washington, D.C.	United States	Bender Arena
24 March 2007	Camden	United States	Tweeter Center at the Waterfront
26 March 2007	New York City	United States	WaMu Theatre
27 March 2007	New York City	United States	WaMu Theatre
28 March 2007	Boston	United States	Agganis Arena
30 March 2007	Montreal	Canada	Quebec Metropolis Centre
31 March 2007	Toronto	Canada	Ricoh Coliseum
1 April 2007	Detroit	United States	The Fillmore Detroit
2 April 2007	Chicago	United States	Aragon Ballroom
4 April 2007	St. Louis	United States	The Pageant
5 April 2007	Milwaukee	United States	Eagles Ballroom
6 April 2007	Minneapolis	United States	Northrop Auditorium
7 April 2007	Winnipeg	Canada	Burton Cummings Theatre
9 April 2007	Calgary	Canada	MacEwan Hall
10 April 2007	Edmonton	Canada	Shaw Conference Centre

Typical set list

1. "Spitting Games"
2. "It's Beginning to Get to Me"
3. "Chocolate"
4. "Headlights on Dark Roads"
5. "How to Be Dead"
6. "Grazed Knees"
7. "Chasing Cars"
8. "Shut Your Eyes"
9. "Set the Fire to the Third Bar"
10. "Somewhere a Clock is Ticking"
11. "Make this Go on Forever"
12. "Ways and Means"
13. "Run"
14. "You're All I Have"

Encore

15. "The Finish Line"
16. "Open Your Eyes"
17. "Hands Open"

== Japanese Tour ==
After playing successfully at the Fuji Rock Festival in the summer, the band returned to Japan in 2007 to play a short four date tour. The shows, scheduled to be held in February were cancelled and rescheduled to April. Tickets for the previous shows were deemed valid for the new dates.

Tour dates

Date	City	Country	Venue
~~1 February 2007~~	~~Tokyo~~	~~Japan~~	~~Liquid Room~~ (CANCELLED)
~~2 February 2007~~	~~Tokyo~~	~~Japan~~	~~Liquid Room~~ (CANCELLED)
~~4 February 2007~~	~~Nagoya~~	~~Japan~~	~~Club Quattro~~ (CANCELLED)
~~5 February 2007~~	~~Osaka~~	~~Japan~~	~~Club Quattro~~ (CANCELLED)
14 April 2007	Osaka	Japan	Club Quattro
15 April 2007	Nagoya	Japan	Club Quattro
17 April 2007	Tokyo	Japan	Liquid Room
18 April 2007	Tokyo	Japan	Liquid Room

== North American Tour (Leg II) ==
After spending the summer playing at various rock festivals, Snow Patrol headlined another North American Tour. Hot Hot Heat acted as the support on all dates of the tour. The tour saw the band visit various venues in US and Canada. The tour also included a lone date in Mexico City, which was the earlier show on the previous North American Tour that had to be cancelled.

In between the tour, the band also played at the Lollapalooza Festival. It was later announced that the band was forced to cancel the last two shows. A refund was offered to the fans who bought tickets. The tour began in mid-July and continued till early August.

Tour dates

Date	City	Country	Venue
Support act: Hot Hot Heat
17 July 2007	Santa Barbara	United States	Santa Barbara Bowl
18 July 2007	Phoenix	United States	Dodge Theater
19 July 2007	Las Vegas	United States	Pearl Concert Theater
22 July 2007	Los Angeles	United States	Greek Theatre
23 July 2007	Los Angeles	United States	Greek Theatre
26 July 2007	Mexico City	Mexico	Teatro Metropólitan
30 July 2007	Denver	United States	Red Rocks Amphitheatre
1 August 2007	Norman	United States	Oklahoma City Zoo Amphitheatre
2 August 2007	Kansas City	United States	Uptown Theater
3 August 2007	Indianapolis	United States	White River State Park
~~6 August 2007~~	~~Sterling Heights~~	~~United States~~	~~Freedom Hill Amphitheatre~~ (CANCELLED)
~~7 August 2007~~	~~Toronto~~	~~Canada~~	~~Molson Amphitheatre~~ (CANCELLED)

== One-off shows ==
On Zane Lowe's radio show aired on 24 January 2006, it was announced that Snow Patrol were to play a one-off show at KOKO on 12 April. The band was supported by The Spinto Band & Desert Hearts, which would go on to again support Snow Patrol on their UK & Ireland Tour. Later, a day before kicking off their UK & Ireland Tour of May 2006, the band played a lone date at the Virgin Megastores in Dundrum.

While playing at various music festivals in July 2006, the band played a one-off show in Leeds. They were supported by Ed Harcourt on the show. In August 2006, while playing at various rock festivals around Europe, the band played a lone show at Douglas, Isle of Man. Republic of Loose supported them at the concert. In September 2006, they played an acoustic show for Virgin Radio listeners. Before the show, the band signed an Epiphone SG Special guitar, which was given away on Ben Jones' Most Wanted show two days later, when the concert was broadcast.

Snow Patrol played at National Public Radio's World Cafe in February 2007, a session that could be heard on nearly 200 stations around the world. The band played for the Philadelphia station WXPN. The set was rebroadcast on 3 and 5 March 2007. In June 2007, the band played two one-off shows, one at London's O_{2} Arena, and another at King Tut's. The show at King Tut's was free and sponsored by Xfm. At the London show, the band was supported by Ash and The Twilight Sad. This was the last UK headline show Snow Patrol played in 2007. It was later announced that there would a secret show at the O_{2} on the 27th, the night before the known date. The show was specially O_{2}, to thank the workers involved in the redevelopment of the arena and the local community.

Snow Patrol returned to Bangor, hometown to founding members Lightbody and Quinn in September. They organized a mini festival, which featured various support acts – Ash, The Dead 60s, Simple Kid, Kowalski and We Are Scientists.

Tour dates

Date	City	Country	Venue
12 April 2006	London	England	KOKO
28 April 2006	Dublin	Ireland	Virgin Megastores
15 July 2006	Leeds	England	Millennium Square
21 August 2006	Douglas	Isle of Man	Royal Hall Villa Marina
2 February 2007	Philadelphia	United States	World Cafe for WXPN
5 June 2007	Glasgow	Scotland	King Tut's Wah Wah Hut
28 June 2007	London	England	The O_{2} arena
1 September 2007	Bangor	Northern Ireland	Ward Park

== Festivals ==
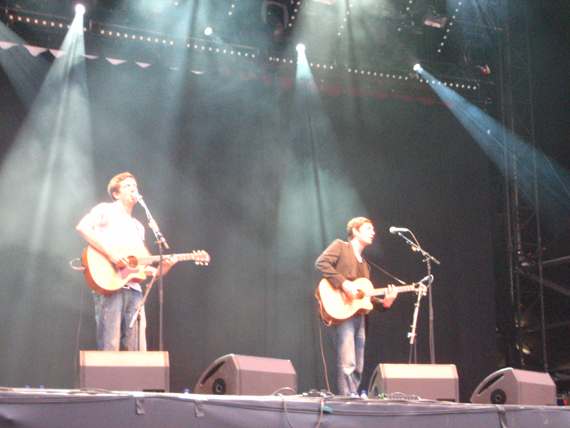
Gary Lightbody and Nathan Connolly at Pukkelpop on 17 August 2006.

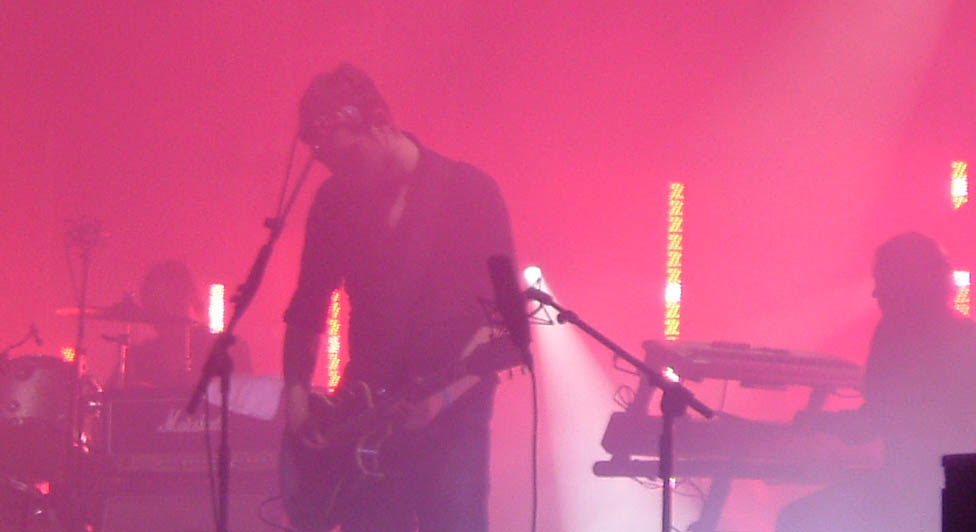
Snow Patrol at the Latitude Festival on 14 July 2006.

Snow Patrol made appearances at various music festivals throughout the tour for Eyes Open. Keyboardist Tom Simpson was arrested on 7 July 2007, which put the band's headlining set the next day (at T in the Park) in jeopardy. He was held at London's Heathrow Airport on the suspicion of possessing Class A drugs, mere hours after the band played at Live Earth, which made him miss the Oxegen Festival performance that night. The band had started searching for a replacement for Simpson, who however was released in time to play at T in the Park.

The appearance at Bangkok's 100 Rock Festival marked the first time the band played in Southeast Asia. At Lollapalooza, the band was joined by Silversun Pickups' bassist Nikki Monninger to sing Martha Wainwright's vocal parts on "Set the Fire to the Third Bar".

Tour dates

Date	City	Country	Venue
19 February 2006	Bangkok	Thailand	100 Rock Festival @ Muang Thong Thani Lakeside
17 March 2006	Austin	United States	SXSW @ Stubb's B-B-Q
29 April 2006	Dublin	Ireland	Heineken Green Energy @ Dublin Castle
13 May 2006	Dundee	Scotland	BBC Radio 1's Big Weekend @ Camperdown Country Park
13 July 2006	Arvika	Sweden	Arvika Festival
14 July 2006	Suffolk	England	Latitude Festival @ Henham Park
23 July 2006	Byron Bay	Australia	Splendour in the Grass @ Belongil Fields
28 July 2006	Incheon	South Korea	Pentaport Rock Festival @ Daewoo Motors Field
30 July 2006	Niigata	Japan	Fuji Rock Festival @ Naeba Ski Resort
10 August 2006	Oslo	Norway	Oya Festival
17 August 2006	Kiewit-Hasselt	Belgium	Pukkelpop
19 August 2006	Dublin	Ireland	Marlay Park
20 August 2006	Biddinghuizen	Netherlands	Lowlands Festival
23 August 2006	Belfast	Northern Ireland	Tennents ViTal @ Botanic Gardens
25 August 2006	Edinburgh	Scotland	T on the Fringe @ Meadowbank Stadium
26 August 2006	Cardiff	Wales	Get Loaded in the Park @ Coopers Field
27 August 2006	Cornwall	England	Eden Sessions @ The Domes
2 September 2006	Jersey	Jersey	Jersey Live @ Royal Jersey Showground
27 May 2007	Landgraaf	Netherlands	Pinkpop Festival @ Megaland Park
8 June 2007	Isle of Wight	England	e @ Seaclose Park
21 June 2007	Bonn	Germany	Summerstage Festival @ Museumsplatz
22 June 2007	Tuttlingen	Germany	Southside Festival
24 June 2007	Scheeßel	Germany	Hurricane Festival @ Eichenring Motorcycle Speedway
30 June 2007	Werchter	Belgium	Rock Werchter
1 July 2007	St. Gallen	Switzerland	St. Gallen Festival
7 July 2007	Dublin	Ireland	Oxegen Festival @ Punchestown Racecourse
8 July 2007	Kinross	Scotland	T in the Park @ Balado Airfield
4 August 2007	Chicago	United States	Lollapalooza @ Grant Park
16 August 2007	Salzburg	Austria	Frequency Festival
18 August 2007	Chelmsford	England	V Festival @ Hylands Park
19 August 2007	South Staffordshire	England	V Festival @ Weston Park

=== Side shows ===
Snow Patrol played a special surprise acoustic set a day before their headlining set at SXSW 2006. After the band's performance at Splendour in the Grass, the band played two side-shows in Australia before heading to South Korea for the Pentaport Rock Festival. Starky supported them on both dates, apart from the concert at the Splendour in the Grass festival.

Tour dates

Date	City	Country	Venue
16 March 2006	Austin	United States	Cedar Street Courtyard
Support act: Starky
24 July 2006	Sydney	Australia	Enmore Theatre
25 July 2006	Melbourne	Australia	Metro Nightclub

== Charity events ==
Snow Patrol played an intimate charity show at Rock City on 16 July. The show was organized in aid of Cancerbackup, who provide information and support for cancer sufferers and their families. All proceeds from the show went to Cancerbackup. The band played a special, intimate acoustic show on 3 March in aid of friend, photographer Diana Gualda, who has multiple sclerosis. The band also played at Live Earth, an annual event developed to combat climate change. Keyboardist Tom Simpson was arrested a few hours after playing at the event.

Tour dates

Date	City	Country	Venue
16 July 2006	Nottingham	England	Rock City
3 March 2007	West Hollywood	United States	Diana Gualda benefit @ The Troubadour
7 July 2007	London	England	Live Earth @ Wembley Stadium

== Australian Tour (Leg II) and end of tour ==
Snow Patrol returned to Australia in September, to headline their biggest tour down under at the time. Support for the tour came from Silversun Pickups, who had previously supported the band on their North American Tour, and Iain Archer, past touring member and songwriting collaborator. Two dates in New Zealand were announced later. This marked only the second time the band had toured there. Support for the dates came from Iain Archer and Opshop on one date.

This leg of the Australian Tour marked the end of the touring for Eyes Open. The tour officially ended on 22 September 2007. To mark the event, Gary Lightbody posted a blog on Snow Patrol's official website about his experience in Australia and discussed the band's future plans.

Tour dates

Date	City	Country	Venue
Support acts: Silversun Pickups & Iain Archer
7 September 2007	Sydney	Australia	Acer Arena
8 September 2007	Waratah	Australia	Newcastle Entertainment Centre
10 September 2007	Bruce	Australia	Australian Institute of Sport
12 September 2007	Adelaide	Australia	Adelaide Entertainment Centre
Support acts: Iain Archer & Opshop
14 September 2007	Auckland	New Zealand	Vector Arena
Support act: Iain Archer
15 September 2007	Christchurch	New Zealand	Westpac Arena
Support acts: Silversun Pickups & Iain Archer
17 September 2007	Melbourne	Australia	Rod Laver Arena
19 September 2007	Brisbane	Australia	Brisbane Entertainment Centre
22 September 2007	Perth	Australia	Burswood Entertainment Complex

Typical set list

1. "Hands Open"
2. "Chocolate"
3. "It's Beginning to Get to Me"
4. "Headlights on Dark Roads"
5. "Signal Fire"
6. "Grazed Knees"
7. "How To Be Dead"
8. "Tiny Little Fractures"
9. "Spitting Games"
10. "Chasing Cars"
11. "Shut Your Eyes"
12. "Make this Go on Forever"
13. "Set the Fire to the Third Bar"
14. "Run"

Encore

15. "The Finish Line"
16. "Open Your Eyes"
17. "You're All I Have"

== Tour Reporter ==
The Eyes Open Tour was the first Snow Patrol tour to feature tour reporters. It was first introduced ahead of the North American Tour of 2006. Fans interested in becoming tour reporters were required to fill in their details and tell why they were the ones for the job. One winner was chosen from each town where the band was to play a show. Each tour reporter received two tickets and a photo pass for the respective show. They were required to send the band photos of the show and write a blog sharing their experience. The photos and blogs were then posted on Snow Patrol's official website.

The idea was a success, so the same concept was again introduced for the next leg of the tour, which saw the band play in Europe. The next leg, the UK & Ireland Winter Arena Tour also featured fan tour reporters. This time, two fans were chosen as winners for each show to be the official Snow Patrol Tour Reporters.

Snow Patrol took the tour reporter feature "to the next level" for the Australian, New Zealand, Japanese and North American tours of February–April 2007. This time, two fans are chosen as winners for each date specifically to handle the job of reporter and photographer. The method of applying for the job was the same as before. This feature was dubbed as "Tour Reporter Pro", and it saw Diana Gualda cover her own benefit show. As the time came for Snow Patrol to play at the Isle of Wight Festival, a new feature of the tour reporter, dubbed "Tour Reporter Lite" was introduced. This enabled anybody who was to see the band perform at the festival to share their experience and photos from the event with everyone. Fans were required to log in the member's area and post in the tour reporters section.
