= List of awards and nominations received by Snow Patrol =

Snow Patrol awards and nominations
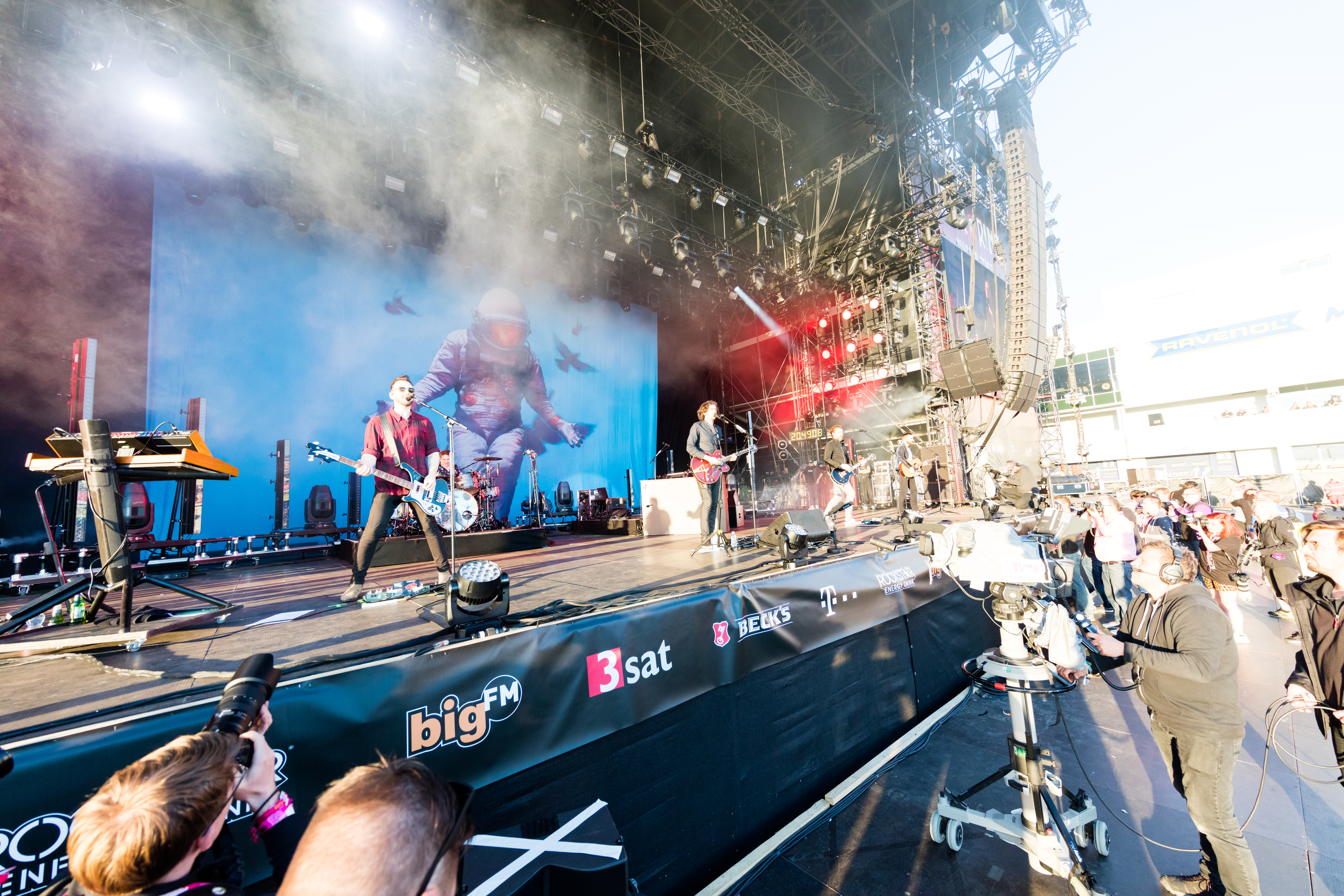
- Snow Patrol live at Rock Am Ring in June 2018
Awards and nominations
Award	Wins	Nominations
Brit Awards	0	6
BMI Awards	7	7
Grammy Awards	0	1
Hot Press Awards	2	3
IFPI Platinum Europe Awards	5	5
Ivor Novello Awards	1	1
Mercury Prize	0	1
Meteor Music Awards	6	10
MTV Europe Music Awards	0	1
MTV Video Music Awards Japan	0	1
Q Awards	1	4
Echo Awards	0	3

Totals (Note: Certain award groups do not simply award one winner. They acknowledge several different recipients, have runners-up, and have third place. Since this is a specific recognition and is different from losing an award, runner-up mentions are considered wins in this award tally. For simplification and to avoid errors, each award in this list has been presumed to have had a prior nomination.)
- Wins: 25
- Nominations: 51

Snow Patrol is a Northern Irish alternative rock band formed in 1994 in Dundee, Scotland. The band consists of vocalist and rhythm guitarist Gary Lightbody, lead guitarist Nathan Connolly, bassist Paul Wilson, drummer Jonny Quinn and keyboardist Tom Simpson. They have released five studio albums to date, which have been released either by the Jeepster or Fiction/Interscope labels. They have sold more than thirteen million albums worldwide.

Snow Patrol first received the Phil Lynott Best New Band award in 1999 at the Hot Press Awards. They also received one Ivor Novello Album Award for their third album Final Straw in 2005. The band has received seven BMI Awards, two for the song "Run" in 2005: "College Song of the Year" and "BMI Pop Award". The other awards were for the songs "Chasing Cars" and "Hands Open", each winning a BMI Pop Award (twice for Chasing Cars, in 2007 and 2008) and for being performed a combined one million times in the United States in 2007. The band has been particularly successful at the Meteor Music Awards, winning six awards from total seven nominations. These awards were for "Best Irish Band" and "Best Irish Album", in 2005 and 2007, "Best Live Performance", in 2007, and "Most Downloaded Song" for "Chasing Cars", in 2007. They have also received five IFPI Platinum Europe Awards; two for the album Final Straw, in 2004 and 2008 for crossing the two million sales mark in Europe; and the others for the album Eyes Open, in 2006, 2007 and 2009, for crossing the three million sales mark in Europe. Overall, Snow Patrol has received 25 awards from 51 nominations.

== BRIT Awards ==
The Brit Awards are the British Phonographic Industry's annual pop music awards. Snow Patrol has received six nominations.

Year	Nominee / work	Award	Result
2005	Snow Patrol	Best British Group	Nominated
2005	Snow Patrol	Best British Rock Act	Nominated
2005	Final Straw	Best British Album	Nominated
2007	Snow Patrol	Best British Group	Nominated
2007	Eyes Open	Best British Album	Nominated
2007	"Chasing Cars"	Best British Single	Nominated

== BMI Awards ==
The BMI Awards are the Broadcast Music Incorporated's annual music awards. Snow Patrol has received seven awards from seven nominations.

Year	Nominee / work	Award	Result
2005	"Run"	BMI College Song of the Year	Won
2005	"Run"	BMI Pop Award	Won
2007	"Chasing Cars"	One Million US Performances	Won
2007	"Chasing Cars"	BMI Pop Award	Won
2007	"Hands Open"	One Million US Performances	Won
2007	"Hands Open"	BMI Pop Award	Won
2008	"Chasing Cars"	BMI Pop Award	Won

== Choice Music Prize ==
The Choice Music Prize is awarded to albums which best sum up the year in Irish music. The award doesn't take in airplay as a criterion, and is awarded solely on the basis of artistic merit. The award is the Irish equivalent of the UK's Mercury Music Prize. Snow Patrol has received one nomination.

Year	Nominee / work	Award	Result
2006	Eyes Open	Album of the Year	Nominated

== Echo Awards ==
The Echo Awards is a German music award event which is held annually. Each year's winner is determined by the previous year's sales, Snow Patrol has received three nominations.

Year	Nominee / work	Award	Result
2007	Snow Patrol	International Newcomer of the Year	Nominated
2008	Snow Patrol	International Group of the Year	Nominated
2012	Snow Patrol	International Rock/Pop Group	Nominated

== Grammy Awards ==
The Grammy Awards are presented annually by the National Academy of Recording Arts and Sciences of the United States for outstanding achievements in the music industry. Snow Patrol has received one nomination.

Year	Nominee / work	Award	Result
2007	"Chasing Cars"	Best Rock Song	Nominated

== Hot Press Awards ==
The Hot Press Awards are annually hosted by the Irish magazine Hot Press. Snow Patrol has received two awards from three nominations.

Year	Nominee / work	Award	Result
1999	Snow Patrol	Phil Lynott Award for Best New Band	Won
2002	When It's All Over We Still Have to Clear Up	Best Irish Album	Nominated
2009	Snow Patrol	Irish Band of the Decade	Won

== IFPI Platinum Europe Award ==
The IFPI Platinum Europe Award is an award given by International Federation of the Phonographic Industry to artists that have sold one million copies of an album in Europe. Snow Patrol has received five awards.

Year	Nominee / work	Award	Result
2004	Final Straw	One Million European Sales	Won
2006	Eyes Open	One Million European Sales	Won
2007	Eyes Open	Two Million European Sales	Won
2008	Final Straw	Two Million European Sales	Won
2009	Eyes Open	Three Million European Sales	Won

== International Dance Music Awards ==
The International Dance Music Awards are annual music awards held at the Winter Music Conference. Snow Patrol has received one nomination.

Year	Nominee / work	Award	Result
2007	"Chasing Cars"	Best Alternative/Rock Dance Track	Nominated

== Ivor Novello Awards ==
The Ivor Novello Awards are presented annually by the British Academy of Songwriters, Composers and Authors (BASCA) for excellence in songwriting and composing. Snow Patrol has received one awards from one nomination.

Year	Nominee / work	Award	Result
2005	Final Straw	Ivor Novello Album Award	Won

== NME Awards ==
The NME Awards are the annual music awards given out by the New Musical Express (NME). Snow Patrol has received one nomination.

Year	Nominee / work	Award	Result
2005	Snow Patrol	Best British Band	Nominated

== Mercury Prize ==
The Mercury Prize is an annual music prize awarded for the best album from the United Kingdom or Ireland. The award is the UK equivalent of Ireland's Choice Music Prize. Snow Patrol has received one nomination.

Year	Nominee / work	Award	Result
2004	Final Straw	Best Album	Nominated

== Meteor Music Awards ==
The Meteor Music Awards are the national music awards of Ireland. Snow Patrol has received seven awards from been ten nominations.

Year	Nominee / work	Award	Result
2004	Snow Patrol	Best Irish Band	Nominated
2005	Snow Patrol	Best Irish Band	Won
2005	Final Straw	Best Irish Album	Won
2007	Snow Patrol	Best Irish Band	Won
2007	Snow Patrol	Best Live Performance	Won
2007	Eyes Open	Best Irish Album	Won
2007	"Chasing Cars"	Most Downloaded Song	Won
2010	Snow Patrol	Best Irish Band	Won
2010	Snow Patrol	Best Irish Live Performance	Nominated
2010	Up to Now	Best Irish Album	Nominated

== MTV Europe Music Awards ==
The MTV Europe Music Awards (EMA) are annual music awards to celebrate the most popular music videos in Europe. Snow Patrol has received one nomination.

Year	Nominee / work	Award	Result
2012	Snow Patrol	Best World Stage Performance	Nominated

== MTV Video Music Awards Japan ==
The MTV Video Music Awards Japan are annual music awards organised by MTV Japan. Snow Patrol has received one nomination.

Year	Nominee / work	Award	Result
2008	"Signal Fire"	Best Video from a Film	Nominated

== Q Awards ==
The Q Awards are the UK's annual music awards run by the music magazine Q. Snow Patrol has received one award from four nominations.

Year	Nominee / work	Award	Result
2004	Snow Patrol	Best New Act	Nominated
2006	Eyes Open	Best Album	Nominated
2006	"Chasing Cars"	Best Track	Nominated
2011	"Chasing Cars"	Classic Song	Won

== Silver Clef Awards ==
The "O2 Silver Clef Lunch" is annually held in aid of Nordoff-Robbins Music Therapy Charity. The event features the Silver Clef Awards. Snow Patrol has received one award from one nomination.

Year	Nominee / work	Award	Result
2007	Snow Patrol	Best British Group	Won

== TEC Awards ==
The TEC Awards are annually awarded to recognise achievements of audio professionals. They honour the individuals, companies and technical innovations behind the sound of recordings, films, TV shows and live performances. Snow Patrol has received one nomination.

Year	Nominee / work	Award	Result
2007	"Chasing Cars"	Record Production/Single or Track	Nominated

== UK Festival Awards ==
The UK Festival Awards is an annual event of UK festival scene which allows festival-goers to set the continuing standard. Snow Patrol has received one award from three nominations.

Year	Nominee / work	Award	Result
2007	Snow Patrol	Most Memorable Moment	Won
2009	Snow Patrol	Best Headliner – Radio 1's Big Weekend	Nominated
2009	Snow Patrol	Best Headliner – V Festival	Nominated

== Heritage Award ==
In June 2010 the band were commemorated with a Heritage Award by PRS for Music. A plaque was erected on the Duke of York pub in Belfast where the band performed their first gig. The band was only the sixth to receive the award along with the likes of Blur and Elton John. With all the members turning out, they later performed a live set to a small crowd of around 30 people. Quinn described the award as an "honour", and said the plaque meant more to him than other awards that they have received along the way.

== Other recognitions ==
- 2001 – When It's All Over We Still Have to Clear Up ranked No. 50 in CMJ New Music's Top 75 in August 2001.
- 2001 – When It's All Over We Still Have to Clear Up ranked No. 6 in the Hot Press Critics Choice Albums in 2001.
- 2001 – "One Night is Not Enough" listed on the "Highly Recommended" list in the Hot Press Critics Choice Singles in 2001.
- 2002 – When It's All Over We Still Have to Clear Up ranked No. 6 for Best Album and No. 4 for Best Debut Album categories in the 2002 Hot Press Readers Poll.
- 2004 – Final Straw nominated to the "Long List" for the 2004 Shortlist Music Prize.
- 2004 – "Run" ranked No. 22 in NME's Tracks of the Year.
- 2006 – "Chasing Cars" ranked #1 in Virgin Radio's Top 500 Songs of All Time.
- 2006 – "Chasing Cars" ranked No. 49 in Rolling Stone's The 100 Best Songs of the Year.
- 2006 – Final Straw ranked No. 91 in NME's 100 Best Albums of All Time.
- 2008 – "Chasing Cars" named one of the Greatest British Songs on 2000s by Q.
- 2008 – Eyes Open ranked No. 27 in The Irish Times' Top 40 Irish Albums.
- 2009 – "Run" ranked No. 43 in Xfm's 100 Best British Songs of All Time
- 2009 – "Chasing Cars" ranked No. 60 in Xfm's 100 Best British Songs of All Time
- 2009 – Snow Patrol ranked No. 22 in The Irish Times' The Best Irish Acts Right Now.
- 2009 – "Run" ranked No. 65 in Xfm's Top 100 Songs of All Time.
- 2009 – "Run" ranked No. 42 in Xfm's Songs of the Decade.
- 2009 – Snow Patrol ranked No. 10 in Ulster's Top 10 exports.
- 2009 – "Chasing Cars" ranked No. 32 in The Sunday Times's Songs of the Noughties (2000s).
- 2009 – "Run" ranked No. 6 in Absolute Radio's Song of the Decade.
- 2009 – "Chasing Cars" ranked No. 4 in Absolute Radio's Song of the Decade.
- 2009 – Eyes Open ranked No. 8 in Amazon.co.uk's Best Selling Albums of the Decade.
- 2009 – Snow Patrol ranked No. 6 in Amazon.co.uk's Best Selling Artists of the Decade.
- 2009 – "Chasing Cars" named Channel 4's Greatest Song of the Noughties.
- 2009 – "Chasing Cars" named the Most Played Song of the Decade by music licensing body Phonographic Performance Limited.
