= Open Your Eyes (Snow Patrol song) =

2007 single by Snow Patrol

Single by Snow Patrol

from the album Eyes Open
- Released: 12 February 2007
- Recorded: 2005
- Genre: Alternative rock; power pop; post-Britpop
- Length: 5:41
- Label: Interscope
- Songwriters: Gary Lightbody; Nathan Connolly; Tom Simpson; Paul Wilson; Jonny Quinn
- Producer: Jacknife Lee

Snow Patrol singles chronology
"Set the Fire to the Third Bar" (2006)	"Open Your Eyes" (2007)	"Shut Your Eyes" (2007)

Audio sample
- "Open Your Eyes": file; help

Music video
- "Open Your Eyes" on YouTube

"Open Your Eyes" is a song by Northern Irish alternative rock band Snow Patrol, released on 12 February 2007 as the fifth single of their fourth album, Eyes Open (2006).

The song experienced particular success in Brazil, where it ended at number 21 on the country year-end airplay chart, published by Crowley Broadcast Analysis.

== Music video ==
The song's music video is footage from the classic cult film C'était un rendez-vous by director Claude Lelouch. It marked the first time Lelouch granted permission to anyone to use footage from the movie. Q chose it as their Video of the Week on 6 February 2007.

== In popular culture ==
The song was used as the theme music to BBC One's Football Focus. The song gained more popularity after being featured during the emotional season twelve finale of ER. Sales of the song on iTunes rose as the song was later featured in a third season episode of The 4400, season 3 episode 2 of Grey's Anatomy, the pilot episode of The Black Donnellys, season 4 episode 21 of Brothers and Sisters, the second season finale of Being Erica, and season 9 episode 23 of The Office.

It was additionally used in the 2008 Penn State IFC/Panhellenic Dance Marathon video entitled "Don't Waste One Minute"; in the trailer for the 2008 MTV film Stop-Loss; in a promo for season two of Gossip Girl; as the soundtrack to the "best bits" of the British reality series Celebrity Big Brother 5; and as the theme for Barack Obama's 2008 presidential campaign, being played at many rallies. The song is used as the background music to the advert for the BBC High Definition service and was heavily featured in the BBC series The Real Swiss Family Robinson, where privileged families were sent to deserted islands to try and survive for three weeks. The song was used in mini movies about children living in Africa suffering from cataracts, which was made for Comic Relief. It was also featured in the 2007 film The Invisible along with "You're All I Have" and was later used in the final moments of the 2013 Formula 1 documentary film 1: Life on the Limit.

== Track listing ==
UK CD/7-inch/Digital download

1. "Open Your Eyes" – 5:41
2. "I Am an Astronaut" – 2:42
- "I Am an Astronaut" was previously featured on the Save the Children compilation album Colours Are Brighter.

Australian CD

1. "Open Your Eyes" – 5:41
2. "I Am an Astronaut" – 2:42
3. "You're All I Have" (live in Hamburg) – 4:42
4. "Open Your Eyes" (music video)
5. "Shut Your Eyes" (music video)

CD promo

1. "Open Your Eyes" (radio edit) – 3:56
2. "Open Your Eyes" – 5:41

12-inch promo

1. "Open Your Eyes" (Allende Remix) – 7:29
2. "Chasing Cars" (Topher Jones & Blake Jarrell Remix) – 7:35

Unofficial releases

1. "Open Your Eyes" (Marky and Bungle Remix) – 5:43
2. "Open Your Eyes" (Tiësto Remix) (Private / Unreleased Remix)
3. "Open Your Eyes" (Redanka Mix) – 8:08
4. "Open Your Eyes" (Walker Remix) – 6:26

== Reception ==
Yahoo! Music's Adam Webb had mixed reviews for the single. He rated it five stars out of ten and criticized them for "making the same record over and over again", though he stated "Set the Fire to the Third Bar" an exception. He called the song "a return to the formula of "Run", "Chasing Cars" and so on and so forth." He criticized the song further by saying that it sounded like "five young men caught in the headlights as Gary Lightbody sings about aching bones and cold skin over a clipped guitar riff, before everything explodes in an orgy of significance and strait-laced posturing. By the end, the boys in the band are furiously hammering away, heads down, no nonsense, wham bam thank you mam."

The Irish Times columnist Brian Boyd derided Snow Patrol as "life-support machine music" due to the overuse of their songs on medical dramas such as Grey's Anatomy. Q called the single "genuinely good".

== Charts ==
=== Weekly charts ===
Weekly chart performance for "Open Your Eyes"
Chart (2007)	Peak position
Australia (ARIA)	53
Belgium (Ultratip Bubbling Under Flanders)	6
Germany (GfK)	73
Ireland (IRMA)	21
Scotland Singles (Official Charts)	15
UK Singles (Official Charts)	26
UK Airplay (Music Week)	14

=== Year-end charts ===
Year-end chart performance for "Open Your Eyes"
Chart (2007)	Position
Brazil (Crowley Broadcast Analysis)	21

== Certifications ==
Region	Certification	Certified units/sales
Australia (ARIA)	2× Platinum	140,000^{‡}
Brazil (Pro-Música Brasil)	2× Platinum	120,000^{‡}
New Zealand (RMNZ)	Gold	15,000^{‡}
United Kingdom (BPI)	Gold	400,000^{‡}
^{‡} Sales+streaming figures based on certification alone.
