= Shut Your Eyes =

2007 single by Snow Patrol

Single by Snow Patrol

from the album Eyes Open
- Released: 20 April 2007
- Genre: Indie rock
- Length: 3:17
- Label: Umvd Import, Polydor, Fiction
- Songwriters: Gary Lightbody, Nathan Connolly, Tom Simpson, Paul Wilson and Jonny Quinn
- Producer: Jacknife Lee

Snow Patrol singles chronology
"Open Your Eyes" (2007)	"Shut Your Eyes" (2007)	"Signal Fire" (2007)

"Shut Your Eyes" is a song by Northern Irish alternative rock band Snow Patrol from their fourth album, Eyes Open (2006). It was released as a single in several countries in 2007.

The various B-sides featured on the single are taken from a Snow Patrol live performance at Columbiahalle, Berlin on 9 February 2007. The live renditions of "Spitting Games", "Run", and "Chocolate" included on the single later appeared on the Australian version of the "Signal Fire" single.

Drummer Jonny Quinn declared that "Shut Your Eyes" is his favourite song to play live because of the interaction with the audience when the band performs it.

== Music video ==
The official music video was directed by Mark Thomas and it premiered on Yahoo! Music on 10 July 2007.

== Track listing ==
German CD

- Version I:
1. "Shut Your Eyes" – 3:17
2. "Headlights on Dark Roads" (Live in Berlin) – 3:35
3. "Chocolate" (Live in Berlin) – 3:01
4. "You're All I Have" (Live in Berlin) – 4:38
- Version II:
1. "Shut Your Eyes" – 3:17
2. "Set the Fire to the Third Bar" (Live in Berlin) – 3:27
3. "Spitting Games" (Live in Berlin) – 4:19
4. "Chasing Cars" (Live in Berlin) – 4:29
- Version III:
1. "Shut Your Eyes" – 3:17
2. "Open Your Eyes" (Live in Berlin) – 5:44
3. "Run" (Live in Berlin) – 5:36
4. "Shut Your Eyes" (Live in Berlin) – 3:29

Dutch CD

- Version I:
1. "Shut Your Eyes" – 3:17
2. "Chasing Cars" (Live in Berlin) – 4:29

This was the only Dutch release, released on 5 October 2007.

Unofficial Releases

- Spencer Collective Mixes Bootleg (12" Vinyl):
1. "Shut Your Eyes" (Main Mix) – 7:28
2. "Shut Your Eyes" (Dub Mix) – 6:56
- Naum Gabo Remix (12" Vinyl):
1. "Shut Your Eyes" (Naum Gabo Remix) – 7:00

== Charts ==
=== Weekly charts ===
Chart (2007–08)	Peak position
Austria (Ö3 Austria Top 40)	12
Belgium (Ultratop 50 Flanders)	1
Belgium (Ultratip Bubbling Under Wallonia)	6
Germany (GfK)	15
Germany Airplay (BVMI)	5
Netherlands (Dutch Top 40)	14
Netherlands (Single Top 100)	17
Switzerland (Schweizer Hitparade)	26
US Adult Alternative Airplay (Billboard)	1

=== Year-end charts ===
Chart (2007)	Position
Belgium (Ultratop 50 Flanders)	29
Germany (Media Control GfK)	72

Chart (2008)	Position
Netherlands (Dutch Top 40)	73

== Certifications ==
Certifications for "Shut Your Eyes"
Region	Certification	Certified units/sales
Germany (BVMI)	Gold	150,000^{‡}
^{‡} Sales+streaming figures based on certification alone.
