= Set the Fire to the Third Bar =

2006 single by Snow Patrol and Martha Wainwright

Single by Snow Patrol featuring Martha Wainwright

from the album Eyes Open
- Released: 13 November 2006
- Recorded: 2005
- Length: 3:22
- Label: Interscope
- Songwriters: Gary Lightbody, Nathan Connolly, Tom Simpson, Paul Wilson and Jonny Quinn
- Producer: Jacknife Lee

Snow Patrol singles chronology
"Hands Open" (2006)	"Set the Fire to the Third Bar" (2006)	"Open Your Eyes" (2007)

Martha Wainwright singles chronology
"Far Away" (2005)	"Set the Fire to the Third Bar" (2006)	"Bleeding All Over You" (2008)

Audio sample
- "Set the Fire to the Third Bar": file; help

"Set the Fire to the Third Bar" is a song by Northern Irish alternative rock band Snow Patrol, featuring Martha Wainwright on vocals. It was released on 13 November 2006 as the fourth single of their fourth album, Eyes Open (2006).

== Background ==
The song was the last track to be recorded for the album Eyes Open and was the third single released from the album. It was written especially with Martha in mind. Gary Lightbody wrote the song in only twenty minutes and described it as the quickest he had ever written a song. The song title describes an electric heater. While writing in the freezing cold and wearing fingerless gloves Lightbody recalled that as a child his Aunt Jean had an electric heater, and "if we were very good and it was very cold, she'd let us put all three bars on" and he goes on to say how it represents "a beacon of warmth within a song about distance".

The song is about a long distance relationship and its lyrics talk of a couple involved in one: ("I'm miles from where you are") and their longing to be together again ("I pray that something picks me up/ And sets me down in your warm arms"). After their long journey to meet each ("After I have travelled so far") they would settle down in front of an electric bar fire ("We'd set the fire to the third bar") and enjoy being together and warm.

The song was recorded at Grouse Lodge Studios, Westmeath, and Apollo Studios, Dublin.

== Other versions ==
The song has been remixed by Anu Pillai of the band Freeform Five, a friend of Gary Lightbody and Tom Simpson.

On 12 November 2009, Snow Patrol performed a version of "Set the Fire to the Third Bar" with former Girls Aloud singer Cheryl for Children in Need Rocks the Royal Albert Hall.

=== Guest vocalists ===
Snow Patrol have featured many guest vocalists for live performances of the song. Singers such as Lisa Hannigan, Miriam Kaufmann and actress Maria Doyle Kennedy have joined them during performances in the Republic of Ireland. In the United Kingdom they have been joined by artists such as Cheryl, and for their Royal Albert Hall show Andrea Corr and unusually by a male vocalist, comedian James Corden. Shauna Tohill, from the band Silhouette, joined the band to perform the song live at the 2011 MTV European Music awards.

== Reception ==
Yahoo! Music's Dan Gennoe made comparisons of Snow Patrol with Coldplay throughout his review, calling the song "Gary Lightbody & co's decision to 'do a Coldplay'." He defended Snow Patrol stating that they "spent many a year making quirky, interesting and inspired music, which few wanted. Given the million selling opportunity afforded them by chart-eating anthem "Run", it'd surely be a fool who chose to return to obscurity." He reviewed the single positively, giving it 7 stars out of 10. Though he felt the song was not "boundary-pushing", it was "certainly interesting", with "Lightbody once again displaying the melodic lightness of touch which has served him so well both pre and post fame." To him, Martha Wainwright's "country quiver" was an "added interest" to the song, which helped "break-up bouts of dourness". He called the song "a bleakly beautiful ballad" and it was a "rare moment where Snow Patrol's emotional ache feels genuinely heartfelt rather than borrowed from Chris Martin."

Alvin Chan from musicOMH reviewed the song positively, calling it "a beautiful track", but felt it was "formulaic through and through." He heaped praise on the music, calling it "artful in its simplicity and, if one is in the right mood, vividly evocative. The unfussy melody is bolstered by gentle strings and buzzing keyboards." He also felt "Gary Lightbody delivers a characteristically raw vocal performance without sounding sappy or indulgent. Lightbody's vocals are perfectly complemented by Canadian songstress Martha Wainwright, whose arrestingly haunting voice is put to good use." He worried the "band's worrying overexposure" could lead the song being "heard in the background of every single TV show, commercial and dramatic montage."

CityLife's Stephen Gilliver felt the song was the standout in a "disappointing" album, and called it "glorious". He said that Martha Wainwright's contribution to the song made it "a trademark brooding Snow Patrol epic of Run or Chasing Cars". He liked the contrast between Wainwright's expressive singing and Lightbody's dry delivery.

== Music video ==
The video was filmed in the UK, directed by Paul McGuigan who later directed the video for "Signal Fire". The music video uses a split screen technique showing the couple very close together but at the same time far away from each other. Gary Lightbody is shown in a white interrogation room. Martha Wainwright is an observation room painted dark blue. He sings into the two way mirror, she looks back at him, close but still separated from him.

== Track listings ==
CD single
No.	Title	Length
1.	"Set the Fire to the Third Bar"	3:22
2.	"You're All I Have (Live in Hamburg)"	4:42

7" vinyl
No.	Title	Length
1.	"Set the Fire to the Third Bar"	3:22
2.	"Chasing Cars (Live in Hamburg)"	4:30

Promo CD
No.	Title	Length
1.	"Set the Fire to the Third Bar (Radio Edit)"	3:16
2.	"Set the Fire to the Third Bar"	3:22

== In popular culture ==
The song is featured in the trailer for the 2010 film Dear John. The song went back into the Billboard Hot 100 chart, four years after its initial release.

== Charts ==
Chart (2006–2010)	Peak position
Belgium Ultratop 50	41
Irish Singles Chart	22
UK Singles (OCC)	18
UK Airplay (Music Week)	28
US Billboard Hot 100	54

== Certifications ==
Certifications for "Set the Fire to the Third Bar"
Region	Certification	Certified units/sales
United Kingdom (BPI)	Gold	400,000^{‡}
^{‡} Sales+streaming figures based on certification alone.
