= You're All I Have =

2006 single by Snow Patrol

Single by Snow Patrol

from the album Eyes Open
- B-side: "The Only Noise"; "Perfect Little Secret"
- Released: 24 April 2006
- Length: 4:33 (album version)
- Label: Fiction; Polydor
- Songwriters: Gary Lightbody; Nathan Connolly; Jonny Quinn; Tom Simpson; Paul Wilson
- Producer: Jacknife Lee

Snow Patrol singles chronology
"How to Be Dead" (2004)	"You're All I Have" (2006)	"Chasing Cars" (2006)

Audio sample
- "You're All I Have": file; help

"You're All I Have" is a song by Northern Irish alternative rock band Snow Patrol. It was released on 24 April 2006 as the lead single from their fourth studio album, Eyes Open (2006). The song was used by RTÉ sport to promote the return of The Sunday Game for the 2006 GAA Championships. It became the band's second top-10 hit in the UK, after "Run" in 2004, peaking at number seven on the UK Singles Chart.

== Background ==
According to Snow Patrol frontman Gary Lightbody: "It's near the beginning of a dangerously reliant relationship. The album is full of songs like this. Rather than a break-up record this is a make-up record. That is a massive generalisation but it is a more positive record than the last". He has said that "the song is about a damaging but fulfilling relationship, something that terrifies you, but you can't quite bring yourself to look away".

== Reception ==
=== Critical reception ===
Yahoo! Music's Ben Gilbert welcomed the single warmly, giving it 7 stars out of 10. He said that the song was Snow Patrol's return to the UK rock scene "with the sort of form that would see an ex-con arrested on sight." Though he criticised the song for being "too much of a mediocre stretch bearing in mind our location in the year 2006 and the current existence of Spank Rock", he defended the song saying "there is a keening momentum and inevitably busted emotional power to Gary Lightbody and co's comeback that suggest all of their dreams are about to come true."

=== Accolades ===
Publication	Country	Accolade	Year	Rank
The Rock FM	New Zealand	The Rock 1000	2008	984

== Music video ==
The music video for the song was directed by Nathan Connolly. It was filmed in a working power station in Kent. It features the band play the song on a platform 120 feet in the air. When the single was released in the United States, another video directed by David S. Goyer was shot. The band flew to Los Angeles for the shoot, from Las Vegas where they had been staying for a while. Connolly later said that the band were not fans of shooting videos. He felt the band could not act, even if they tried and was personally relieved that he was not needed to act in the video.

== Track listings ==
- UK CD single
1. "You're All I Have" (live from Koko)
2. "Run" (live from Koko)
- UK maxi-CD single
1. "You're All I Have"
2. "The Only Noise"
3. "Perfect Little Secret"
4. "You're All I Have" (video)
- UK 7-inch single

A. "You're All I Have"
B. "You're All I Have" (Minotaur Shock remix)

- European CD single
1. "You're All I Have"
2. "The Only Noise"

== Charts ==
=== Weekly charts ===
Chart (2006–2007)	Peak position
Australian Digital Tracks (ARIA)	21
Belgium (Ultratip Bubbling Under Flanders)	9
Canada Hot AC (Billboard)	37
Canada Rock (Billboard)	38
Germany (GfK)	100
Ireland (IRMA)	12
Netherlands (Single Top 100)	88
New Zealand (Recorded Music NZ)	25
Scottish Singles Sales (Official Charts)	7
UK Singles (Official Charts)	7
US Adult Alternative Airplay (Billboard)	6
US Adult Pop Airplay (Billboard)	33
US Alternative Airplay (Billboard)	27
Venezuela Pop Rock (Record Report)	12

=== Year-end charts ===
Chart (2006)	Position
UK Singles (OCC)	60

== Certifications ==
Region	Certification	Certified units/sales
Australia (ARIA)	Gold	35,000^{‡}
United Kingdom (BPI)	Silver	200,000^{^}
^{^} Shipments figures based on certification alone.^{‡} Sales+streaming figures based on certification alone.

== Release history ==
Region	Date	Format(s)	Label(s)	Ref.
United Kingdom	24 April 2006	CD	Fiction; Polydor	
United States	29 January 2007	Alternative radio	A&M	
