= Terra Diablo =

Scottish rock band

- Origin: Glasgow
- Genres: Rock/Indie
- Years active: 2000–present
- Label: Nocturnal (company)
- Members: Ian Fairclough; Dave Fairclough; Rob Carleton; Davie Calder
- Past members: Paul Wilson; Gordon "Gordy" Turner; Dave McAulay; Stu Mileham
- Website: https://www.terradiablo.com/

Terra Diablo is a Scottish rock band signed to Nocturnal Records. The band was formed when singers and guitarists Ian Fairclough and Davey McAuley met while working at the same record store.

They have been managed by Jez Hindmarsh, drummer for Swervedriver, since early 2006. They have supported the likes of Biffy Clyro, Snow Patrol, Hundred Reasons, Six by Seven, Idlewild, and have played at both the Reading and Leeds Festivals and T in the Park. Their original guitarist Paul Wilson left the band in 2005 to join Snow Patrol.

Their second album, Deluge Songs, was produced by Jeremy Parker who has also worked with Evanescence and Mudvayne.

== Releases ==
=== Albums ===
- Terra Diablo – 5 July 2004 (Label: Zuma)
- Deluge Songs – 18 September 2007 (Label: Nocturnal)

=== Singles ===
- "The Smoke" – 18 November 2002 – (Label: B-Unique)
- "Satellites" video – 28 June 2004 – (Label: Zuma)
- (Y)Our Music - 2000 - Not on Label
- The Way Things Are And How They're Meant To Be (10") - Zuma - TD1 - 2001
- Swings & Roundabouts (7", Single) - Zuma - ZUMA006 - 2004
