= Tea for Julie =

American indie rock band

- Origin: Portland, Oregon, United States
- Genres: Indie rock
- Years active: 2003-present
- Members: Michael Deresh; Jad Simpson; Travis Stanek; John Dwyer
- Past members: Denver Warner

Tea for Julie is a Portland, Oregon-based indie rock band that formed in 2003. They have released two full-length albums, 2005's Division and 2008's The Sense in Tying Knots. Although both of their albums were self-released, the band brought on a producer for the second album, resulting in an album that has been described as reflecting more restraint and maturity than their first effort.

In addition to quite a bit of regional radio attention in the Pacific Northwest and notably on Seattle's listener-supported KEXP, the band has played supporting act to artists as varied as Snow Patrol, The Thermals, Evan Dando (The Lemonheads), Menomena, The Ocean Blue, and others.

Their musical style has been likened to that of Coldplay.

Division was No. 66 on KEXP's "top 90.3 albums of 2005." Tea for Julie was one of five bands nominated for Band of the Year, and The Sense in Tying Knots was one of five albums nominated for Album of the Year, at Spectator Magazine's 2009 Portland Music Awards.

== Band members ==
The band has seen several personnel changes since they were formed.

=== Members during the recording of Division ===
- Michael Deresh (vocals, guitar, keys)
- Denver Warner (bass)
- Jad Simpson (drums)

=== Members during the recording of The Sense In Tying Knots ===
- Michael Deresh (vocals, guitar, keys)
- Denver Warner (bass, viola, drum programming, keys)
- Jad Simpson (drums)
- Travis Stanek (guitar)

=== Current band members ===
- Michael Deresh (vocals, guitar, keys)
- Jad Simpson (drums)
- Travis Stanek (guitar)
- John Dwyer (bass)
