= Eyes Open (Snow Patrol album) =

Studio album by Snow Patrol
- Released: 28 April 2006
- Recorded: October–December 2005
- Studios: Grouse Lodge Studios (Ireland); The Garage (Kent); The Garden (London); Angel Recording Studios (London)
- Genres: Alternative rock; power pop; post-Britpop
- Length: 45:05
- Labels: Fiction; Polydor; A&M
- Producer: Jacknife Lee

Snow Patrol chronology
| Final Straw (2003) | Eyes Open (2006) | A Hundred Million Suns (2008) |

Singles from Eyes Open
- 1. "You're All I Have" Released: 24 April 2006; 2. "Chasing Cars" Released: 6 June 2006; 3. "Hands Open" Released: 16 October 2006; 4. "Set the Fire to the Third Bar" Released: 13 November 2006; 5. "Open Your Eyes" Released: 12 February 2007; 6. "Shut Your Eyes" Released: 22 May 2007

Eyes Open is the fourth studio album by Northern Irish alternative rock band Snow Patrol, released on 28 April 2006 in Ireland, 1 May in the United Kingdom, and 9 May in the United States. It is their first album without bassist Mark McClelland and their first to feature bassist Paul Wilson and keyboardist Tom Simpson. Recording for the album took place between October and December 2005 at Grouse Lodge Studios in Ireland, The Garage in Kent, and The Garden and Angel Recording Studios, both in London.

Six singles were released from the album, including top 10 hits "You're All I Have" and "Chasing Cars", the latter of which came to worldwide attention when it was featured during the season 2 finale of the American medical drama Grey's Anatomy.

Eyes Open was the best-selling album of 2006 in the UK, selling 1.5 million copies. It was also the 15th best-selling album of the 2000s, and is one of the best-selling albums in UK chart history.

A 20th anniversary edition was released on 24 July 2026.

== Recording and composition ==
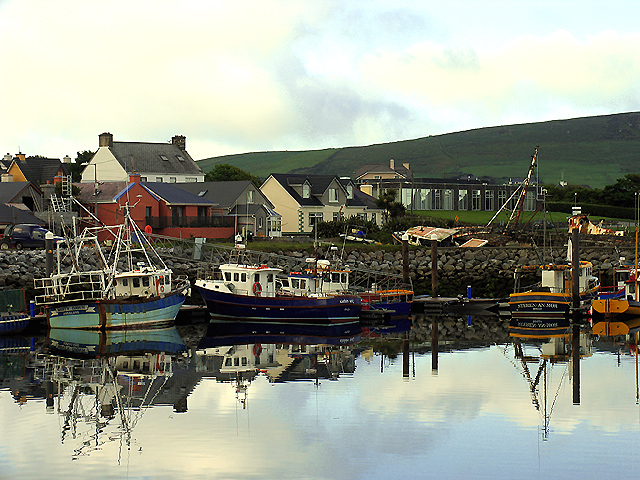
Some of the writing sessions took place in Dingle, Ireland.

Snow Patrol's primary aim for a fourth album was to create a better one than the previous, Final Straw (2003). They felt the need to become better players of their respective instruments as they thought they had "barely [gotten] away" with the success of the last album. Subsequently, keyboardist Tom Simpson and drummer Jonny Quinn took classical piano and drum lessons respectively, during the recording of the album.

The band visited Dingle, on Ireland's west coast and started writing new material. They stayed in a small house, described by Simpson as a "little round house overlooking the sea". They then did some recording in a studio. The main recording sessions, though, happened in an old "condemned" studio in Westmeath, located in the central part of the country. Simpson found the place to be "laid-back" and "almost like a holiday home". The location was in a secluded area, quite distant from any civilization, with animals running around. This helped the band concentrate well without much distraction. The band stayed there for six weeks. Simpson felt the reason why producer Jacknife Lee was taking the band to different places was because he did not want them to get too comfortable with the surroundings. The songs were generally not written as a whole, but the band wrote them as they "came". The writing process thus varied for each song; instead of spending excess time on one and overworking themselves, the band chose to work on another, often revisiting the song later. The band was also constantly changing song arrangements. Due to this, they found they had gotten a much clearer idea of which songs they would ultimately polish to possibly make the album. Simpson noted that the band had much more time to write and record this time, a luxury they had not enjoyed previously.

Inspiration for writing came from the band's record collections, musical tastes and influences. The band, fans of the Posies, met Ken Stringfellow at a couple of festivals they attended, and asked him if he wanted to get involved. He accepted, and visited the studio for a day, contributing piano. The band had been listening to Martha Wainwright's Bloody Mother Fucking Asshole (2005) during the sessions and were fans of it. Towards the end of the recording sessions, Lightbody wrote a duet with her in mind, hoping to get her to sing it. She liked the song and agreed to record it. Eugene Kelly and a few members from the Reindeer Section also appear as choir in various songs throughout the album. Simpson credited Lee for being supportive of the band, and at the same time critical, when necessary. Each band member used to come to him for opinion on work they were doing. Morale during the sessions was high, with the band feeling a sense of togetherness seeing the hard work everyone was doing.

The album is the first without founding bassist Mark McClelland. Simpson feels that the album is more confident than its predecessor, as the band pushed themselves more than ever before during its sessions, and had a better understanding of music. According to him, the album title does not mean anything specific and that it can have its own meaning to different people. Bassist Paul Wilson says that it came from the titles of songs they had written, citing "Open Your Eyes" as an example.

== Appearances in other media ==
The album's third track, "Chasing Cars", was featured on the second-season finale of the ABC prime time hit drama Grey's Anatomy on 15 May 2006. A Grey's Anatomy-themed video of the song can be seen at the ABC website. The seventh track, "Make This Go on Forever", was later used in the third season of Grey's Anatomy, at the end of the episode entitled "Walk on Water" and later in 2018 it was featured in the fourteenth season of the show, during an episode with a story similar to Walk on Water.

The album's tenth track, entitled "Open Your Eyes," was used in the season 4 finale of CBS's Cold Case and in the season 12 finale of ER, the closing scenes of the pilot of The Black Donnellys and also in the second episode of the third season of Grey's Anatomy.

The sixth track, "You Could Be Happy", was used at the beginning the episode "Promise" of Smallville's sixth season, as well as in advertisements for Australian soap Neighbours. The song was also used in Doctor Who: Top 5 Christmas Moments and the penultimate episode of Season 2 of BBC sitcom Gavin & Stacey.

The first track, "You're All I Have", appears on the soundtrack of the teen film The Invisible.

In 2007, "Open Your Eyes" was used as the "Best Bits" song for Celebrity Big Brother 5 during the final watched by over 7 million viewers, the year of the race row.

In 2013, "Open Your Eyes" was heard in the penultimate episode of the hit NBC comedy The Office 9th season and the series. In it, Jim Halpert asks the documentary crew to make a video to prove his love for his wife, Pam Halpert, consisting of footage of their relationship throughout the entire series, during which the song plays.

== Release ==
Eyes Open was made available in four formats:

- Standard CD – with two UK bonus tracks
- Special edition – in a deluxe box, with the full album plus a DVD featuring footage shot over the past months, including the band's tour with U2, special gigs and the making of the new record. Additionally contained exclusive photos and other content.
- Vinyl LP – a double LP gatefold vinyl
- Cassette – only in Indonesia

The artwork for the album and the first single "You're All I Have" was designed by Mat Maitland of Big Active. It was revealed by Hot Press magazine on 16 March 2006, which called it "arty".

== Critical reception ==
Professional ratings
Aggregate scores
| Source | Rating |
|---|---|
| Metacritic | 67/100 |
Review scores
| Source | Rating |
| AllMusic | 4/5 stars |
| The A.V. Club | B+ |
| The Guardian | 4/5 stars |
| Los Angeles Times | 3/4 stars |
| NME | 6/10 |
| Pitchfork | 6.6/10 |
| Q | 4/5 stars |
| Rolling Stone | 3/5 stars |
| Spin | 2/5 stars |
| USA Today | 3.5/4 stars |

Eyes Open received generally positive reviews from music critics. At Metacritic, which assigns a normalised rating to reviews from mainstream critics, the album received an average score of 67 out of 100 based 25 reviews, indicating "generally favorable reviews".

== Commercial performance ==
The album hit number one in its 11th week on the New Zealand chart and reached 2× Platinum therefore shipping over 30,000 units. It also reached #1 in the ARIA Albums Chart, and was certified 3× Platinum on 8 January 2007 (for 210,000+ units shipped). It became the UK's best-selling album of 2006, selling over 1.5 million copies at the end of the year, with a cumulative total of 1.8 million. Furthermore, it peaked at #1 in the Irish Albums Chart, where it went 7× Platinum.

The album sold 36,191 units in its debut week throughout the US, substantially improving from their first week sales of Final Straw. US sales have totalled over 1,200,000 as of October 2008. In the UK, the album has sold over 2,600,000 copies, being certified 8× Platinum by the BPI.

== Track listing ==
All lyrics are written by Gary Lightbody; all music is composed by Gary Lightbody, Nathan Connolly, Tom Simpson, Paul Wilson and Jonny Quinn.

Standard edition
| No. | Title | Length |
|---|---|---|
| 1. | "You're All I Have" | 4:33 |
| 2. | "Hands Open" | 3:17 |
| 3. | "Chasing Cars" | 4:28 |
| 4. | "Shut Your Eyes" | 3:17 |
| 5. | "It's Beginning to Get to Me" | 4:35 |
| 6. | "You Could Be Happy" | 3:04 |
| 7. | "Make This Go on Forever" | 5:47 |
| 8. | "Set the Fire to the Third Bar" (featuring Martha Wainwright) | 3:23 |
| 9. | "Headlights on Dark Roads" | 3:30 |
| 10. | "Open Your Eyes" | 5:41 |
| 11. | "The Finish Line" | 3:28 |

Bonus tracks
| No. | Title | Length |
|---|---|---|
| 12. | "-" | 3:55 |
| 13. | "In My Arms" | 4:36 |
| 14. | "Warmer Climate" | 4:08 |
| 15. | "The Only Noise" | 2:53 |
| 16. | "Perfect Little Secret" | 4:40 |

Deluxe edition bonus tracks
| No. | Title | Length |
|---|---|---|
| 12. | "The Only Noise" | 2:53 |
| 13. | "Perfect Little Secret" | 4:40 |

20 year anniversary special edition bonus tracks (disc 1 and vinyl 2)
| No. | Title | Length |
|---|---|---|
| 12. | "Signal Fire" | 4:27 |
| 13. | "Play Me Like Your Own Hand" | 4:25 |
| 14. | "It Doesn't Matter Where You Are, Just Drive" | 3:37 |
| 15. | "In My Arms" | 4:36 |
| 16. | "Warmer Climate" | 4:09 |
| 17. | "I Am An Astronaut" | 2:41 |
| 18. | "The Only Noise" | 2:54 |
| 19. | "Perfect Little Secret" | 4:42 |

20 year anniversary special edition bonus tracks (disc 2)
| No. | Title | Length |
|---|---|---|
| 1. | "Chasing Cars (Live in Toronto)" | 4:29 |
| 2. | "Your All I Have (Live in Toronto)" | 4:29 |
| 3. | "Shut Your Eyes (Live in Toronto)" | 3:20 |
| 4. | "It's Beginning to Get to Me (Live in Toronto)" | 4:23 |
| 5. | "Your All I Have (MENCAP Little Noise Sessions, Live at Union Chapel)" | 4:14 |
| 6. | "You Could Be Happy (MENCAP Little Noise Sessions, Live at Union Chapel)" | 4:45 |
| 7. | "I Am An Astronaut (MENCAP Little Noise Sessions, Live at Union Chapel)" | 2:22 |
| 8. | "Chasing Cars (MENCAP Little Noise Sessions, Live at Union Chapel)" | 5:14 |
| 9. | "Headlights on Dark Roads (Live in Berlin)" | 3:35 |
| 10. | "Shut Your Eyes (Live in Berlin)" | 3:29 |
| 11. | "Chasing Cars (Live in Berlin)" | 4:29 |
| 12. | "Set The Fire To The Third Bar (Live in Berlin)" | 3:27 |
| 13. | "You're All I Have (Live in Berlin)" | 4:36 |
| 14. | "Open Your Eyes (Live in Berlin)" | 5:45 |
| 15. | "You're All I Have (Minotaur Shock Remix)" | 6:15 |
| 16. | "Hands Open (Freelance Hellraiser Remix)" | 6:29 |

- The untitled twelfth track is a recording of background noise and one of Jacknife Lee's young children talking.
- "Perfect Little Secret" is a solo recording from Gary Lightbody.

== Personnel ==
- Gary Lightbody – songwriter, lead vocals, guitar, backing vocals
- Nathan Connolly – guitar, backing vocals
- Paul Wilson – bass guitar, backing vocals
- Jonny Quinn – drums, percussion
- Tom Simpson – keyboards, samples
- Richard Andrews – art direction
- Iain Archer – background vocals, choir, chorus
- Paul Archer – background vocals, choir, chorus
- James Banbury – arranger, cello
- Sam Bell – engineer
- Leon Bosch – double bass
- Adrian Bradbury – cello
- Charlie Clark – choir, chorus
- Caroline Dale – cello
- John Davies – mastering
- Caroline Dearney – cello
- Richard George – violin
- Ursula Gough – violin
- Janice Graham – violin, leader
- Timothy Grant – viola
- Ciaran Gribbin – choir, chorus
- Hrafnhildur Halldorsdottir – choir, chorus
- William Hawkes – viola
- Rebecca Hirsch – violin
- Peter Hoffman – engineer
- Eugene Kelly – choir, chorus
- Alastair King – choir, arranger, background vocals
- Jacknife Lee – keyboards, programming, background vocals, producer, engineer, mixing, audio production
- Karin Leishman – violin
- Beatrix Lovejoy – violin
- Pauline Lowbury – violin
- Maya Magub – violin
- Mat Maitland – art Direction, images
- Zoe Martlew – cello
- Tom McFall – engineer
- David McGinty – choir, chorus
- Richard Milone – violin
- Maxine Moore – viola
- Steve Morris – violin
- Everton Nelson – violin
- Fergus Peterkin – assistant engineer
- Steve Pryce – engineer
- Richael Reader – choir, chorus
- Jenny Reeve – choir, chorus
- Ben Russell – double bass
- Claire Scott – choir, chorus
- Stacey Seivewright – choir, chorus
- Charles Sewart – violin
- Hilary Skewes – string contractor
- Owen Skinner – mixing assistant
- Dan Tobin Smith – photography
- Stefano Soffia – assistant Engineer
- Matthew Souter – viola
- Cenzo Townshend – mixing
- Martha Wainwright – vocals
- Simon Wakeling – assistant engineer
- Nigel Walton – compilation
- Paul Willey – violin
- Lucy Williams – violin
- Sara Wilson – choir, chorus
- Warren Zielinski – violin

== Charts ==
=== Weekly charts ===
Weekly chart performance for Eyes Open
| Chart (2006–2007) | Peak position |
|---|---|
| Australian Albums (ARIA) | 1 |
| Austrian Albums (Ö3 Austria) | 3 |
| Belgian Albums (Ultratop Flanders) | 9 |
| Belgian Albums (Ultratop Wallonia) | 64 |
| Dutch Albums (Album Top 100) | 6 |
| European Albums (Billboard) | 4 |
| French Albums (SNEP) | 67 |
| German Albums (Offizielle Top 100) | 17 |
| Greek Albums (IFPI) | 22 |
| Hungarian Albums (MAHASZ) | 36 |
| Irish Albums (IRMA) | 1 |
| Japanese Albums (Oricon) | 58 |
| New Zealand Albums (RMNZ) | 1 |
| Norwegian Albums (VG-lista) | 39 |
| Scottish Albums (Official Charts) | 1 |
| Spanish Albums (Promusicae) | 47 |
| Swedish Albums (Sverigetopplistan) | 16 |
| Swiss Albums (Schweizer Hitparade) | 15 |
| UK Albums (Official Charts) | 1 |
| US Billboard 200 | 27 |
| US Top Rock Albums (Billboard) | 9 |

=== Year-end charts ===
2006 year-end chart performance for Eyes Open
| Chart (2006) | Position |
|---|---|
| Australian Albums (ARIA) | 15 |
| Belgian Albums (Ultratop Flanders) | 52 |
| Dutch Albums (Album Top 100) | 77 |
| European Albums (Billboard) | 19 |
| Irish Albums (IRMA) | 2 |
| New Zealand Albums (RMNZ) | 7 |
| UK Albums (OCC) | 1 |
| US Billboard 200 | 109 |
| US Top Rock Albums (Billboard) | 22 |

2007 year-end chart performance for Eyes Open
| Chart (2007) | Position |
|---|---|
| Australian Albums (ARIA) | 16 |
| Austrian Albums (Ö3 Austria) | 38 |
| Belgian Albums (Ultratop Flanders) | 45 |
| Dutch Albums (Album Top 100) | 38 |
| European Albums (Billboard) | 14 |
| German Albums (Offizielle Top 100) | 29 |
| Irish Albums (IRMA) | 14 |
| New Zealand Albums (RMNZ) | 26 |
| Swiss Albums (Schweizer Hitparade) | 76 |
| UK Albums (OCC) | 11 |
| US Billboard 200 | 97 |

2008 year-end chart performance for Eyes Open
| Chart (2008) | Position |
|---|---|
| UK Albums (OCC) | 99 |

2009 year-end chart performance for Eyes Open
| Chart (2009) | Position |
|---|---|
| UK Albums (OCC) | 181 |

=== Decade-end charts ===
Decade-end chart performance for Eyes Open
| Chart (2000–2009) | Position |
|---|---|
| Australian Albums (ARIA) | 42 |
| UK Albums (OCC) | 15 |

== Certifications ==
Certifications and sales for Eyes Open
| Region | Certification | Certified units/sales |
|---|---|---|
| Argentina (CAPIF) | Gold | 20,000^{^} |
| Australia (ARIA) | 4× Platinum | 280,000^{^} |
| Austria (IFPI Austria) | Platinum | 30,000^{*} |
| Belgium (BRMA) | Platinum | 50,000^{*} |
| Canada (Music Canada) | Platinum | 100,000^{^} |
| Denmark (IFPI Danmark) | Gold | 20,000^{^} |
| Germany (BVMI) | 3× Gold | 300,000^{‡} |
| Ireland (IRMA) | 7× Platinum | 105,000^{^} |
| Netherlands (NVPI) | Platinum | 70,000^{^} |
| New Zealand (RMNZ) | 4× Platinum | 60,000^{‡} |
| Singapore (RIAS) | Gold | 5,000^{*} |
| Switzerland (IFPI Switzerland) | Gold | 15,000^{^} |
| United Kingdom (BPI) | 8× Platinum | 2,418,438 |
| United States (RIAA) | Platinum | 1,200,000 |
Summaries
| Europe (IFPI) | 3× Platinum | 3,000,000^{*} |
| Worldwide | — | 10,000,000 |
^{*} Sales figures based on certification alone.^{^} Shipments figures based on certification alone.^{‡} Sales+streaming figures based on certification alone.

== See also ==
- List of best-selling albums of the 2000s (decade) in the United Kingdom
