= Hands Open =

Single by Snow Patrol

from the album Eyes Open
- Released: 16 October 2006
- Recorded: 2005
- Genre: Alternative rock, indie rock
- Length: 3:17
- Label: Interscope
- Songwriters: Gary Lightbody, Nathan Connolly, Jonny Quinn, Tom Simpson & Paul Wilson
- Producer: Jacknife Lee

Snow Patrol singles chronology
"Chasing Cars" (2006)	"Hands Open" (2006)	"Set the Fire to the Third Bar" (2006)

Audio sample
- "Hands Open": file; help

"Hands Open" is a song by Northern Irish alternative rock band Snow Patrol, released on 16 October 2006 as the third single of their fourth album, Eyes Open (2006).

It received substantial radio play on modern rock radio, peaking at number 21 on the US Billboard Modern Rock Tracks chart. However, it did not cross over to any other radio formats, unlike the previous single, "Chasing Cars".

The third verse references American indie-folk singer/songwriter Sufjan Stevens and the song "Chicago" with the lyrics "Put Sufjan Stevens on/And we'll play your favorite song/'Chicago' bursts to life/And your sweet smile remembers you."

The song was featured in the PC game LMA Manager 2007.

Two videos were shot for this song. The first one, released with the single, shows Gary Lightbody walking through a city and tearing holes on the landscape at certain points. Upon entering them, he joins the rest of the band as they play and sings one part of the song, before going out and walking a bit more until tearing another hole and rejoining the band, in a cycle which repeats a few times throughout the video. The second one, accompanying the Australian single release, consists of a series of clips of the band during a U.S. tour.

In Australasia, the cover art is identical to that of "Set the Fire to the Third Bar", due to the latter not being released as a single there.

== Track listings ==
- US promo CD single
1. "Hands Open" – 3:17
- Digital download
1. "Hands Open" (Freelance Hellraiser Remix) – 6:30
- Australian single
1. "Hands Open" – 3:15
2. "Chasing Cars" (Live in Berlin) - 4:28

== Official versions ==
- "Hands Open" (album version) – 3:17
- "Hands Open" (Freelance Hellraiser Remix) – 6:30

== Charts ==
Chart (2006–07)	Peak position
Australia Digital Tracks (ARIA)	21
New Zealand (Recorded Music NZ)	34
US Modern Rock Tracks (Billboard)	21

== Certifications ==
Region	Certification	Certified units/sales
Australia (ARIA)	Gold	35,000^{‡}
^{‡} Sales+streaming figures based on certification alone.
