= Tom Simpson (musician) =

Scottish musician (born 1972)

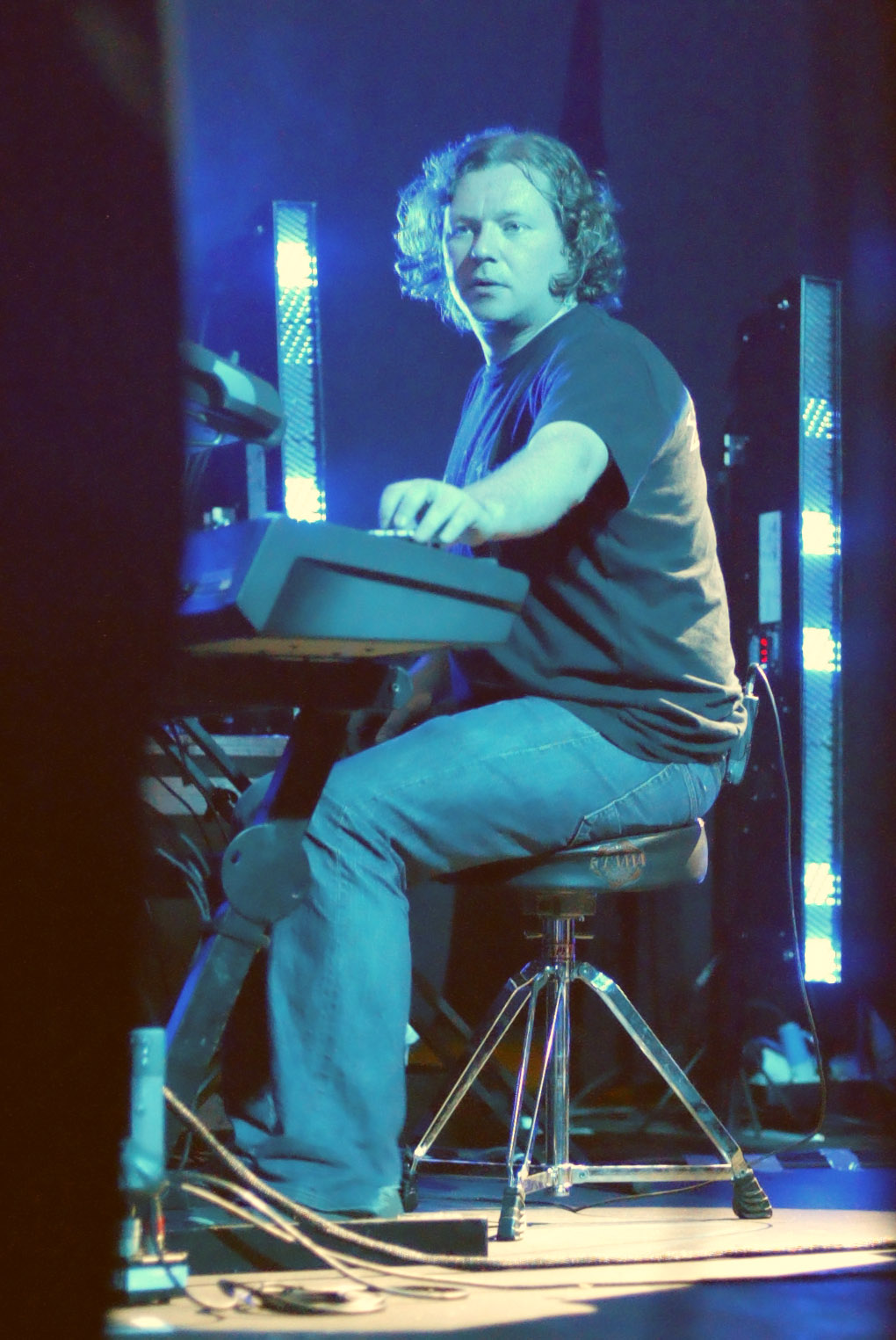
- Simpson at Rock City Nottingham, England in 2006

Background information
- Born: 7 January 1972 (age 53)
- Origin: Dundee, Scotland
- Genres: Alternative rock; power pop; indie rock; electronic; house
- Occupations: DJ; musician
- Instruments: Piano; turntables; sampler; keyboards; synthesizer
- Years active: 1997–present
- Labels: Fiction; Interscope
- Formerly of: Snow Patrol

Tom Simpson (born 7 January 1972) is a Scottish DJ and musician, best known as the former keyboardist of the alternative rock band Snow Patrol. Having been with Snow Patrol as a touring member since 1996, he became a permanent member in 2005, before leaving in August 2013.

== Biography ==
Tom Simpson attended Monifieth High School in Angus, Scotland. He went to the art school in the University of Dundee, the Duncan of Jordanstone College of Art and Design, and has a degree in drawing and painting.

He had no musical leanings as a youngster, but always had aspirations of being a scratch/mix DJ. He started deejaying when he was 17, and used to run a few clubs in Dundee, in whose university Gary Lightbody studied at the time. Lightbody used to visit one of these clubs, and met Simpson one day, and the two ended up becoming friends. Simpson, at the time did not know Lightbody was in a band. However, one day, Lightbody invited him to the university to watch Snow Patrol (his band) play a concert. Simpson liked the band's show, and felt they had "potential" and "a lot of soul". Lightbody was relieved and said that the band would like him to do synthesizers and turn table effects for their first album Songs for Polarbears. He did so and was later invited to join the band as a touring member. He felt happy at the opportunity, as he was finding himself at "crossroads" in his own life.

Simpson began to play the keyboard in his late 20s, and in 2006, began taking classical piano lessons at the insistence of a friend. He has stated that during the years he spent touring with Snow Patrol, he became a musician, despite never having intended to do so. He became a permanent member of Snow Patrol when bassist Paul Wilson was recruited into the band, after founder Mark McClelland was fired. During live performances, Simpson was responsible for playing piano, keyboards, and applying mixing effects/tracks. On 15 August 2013, during a show in Belfast, Gary Lightbody announced that Simpson had decided to leave the band and that this would be his final show with Snow Patrol. After he left, touring member Johnny McDaid took over keyboard duties for the band.

His experience as a DJ includes playing at The Spaceship, Skoolin' and The Phat Clinic which were held at the old Coffee Bar at Duncan of Jordanstone College. His nights at The Spaceship were done in partnership with friends Nick DeCosemo and Anu Pillai (of the band Freeform Five), Lightbody and Roy Kerr. He still follows his passion as DJ in British clubs outside Snow Patrol, often in partnership with his friend and bandmate Gary Lightbody under the moniker Snow Patrol DJs or SP DJs, and with Dave Bowie from the Autodisco DJs.

== Personal life ==
Simpson was accused of possessing Class A drugs in Glasgow in June 2006. He was arrested on 7 July 2007 in RAF Northolt, Middlesex, which put the band's headlining set the next day (at T in the Park) in jeopardy. He was held at London's Heathrow Airport, mere hours after the band played at Live Earth, which made him miss the Oxegen 2007 performance that night. The band had started searching for a replacement for Simpson, but he was released in time to play at T in the Park.

Simpson currently lives in Monifieth, Scotland. He enjoys playing golf and is an avid supporter of Dundee F.C.
