= Paul Wilson (musician) =

Scottish musician (born 1978)

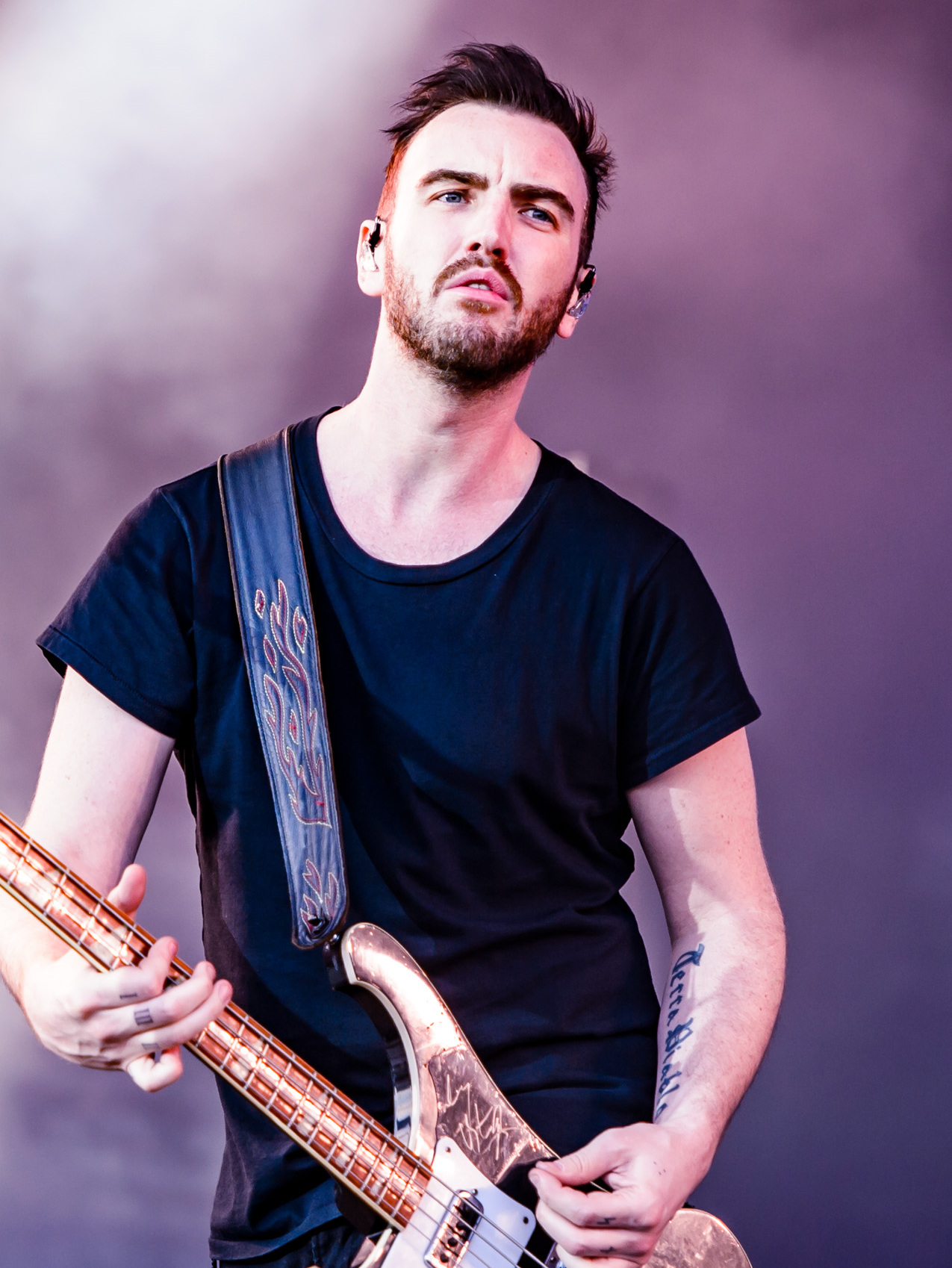
- Wilson with Snow Patrol at Rock im Park 2018

Background information
- Also known as: Pablo
- Born: 20 October 1978 (age 47); Kinlochleven, Argyll, Scotland
- Genres: Alternative rock; indie rock; heavy metal
- Occupations: Musician; songwriter
- Instruments: Bass; vocals; guitar; keyboards
- Years active: 1995–present
- Labels: Fiction; Interscope; Zuma; B-Unique
- Formerly of: Snow Patrol

Paul "Pablo" Wilson (born 20 October 1978) is a Scottish musician, who is best known as the former bass guitarist for Northern Irish–Scottish alternative rock band Snow Patrol. He previously played guitar in Glasgow band Terra Diablo during 2000–2005. Wilson plays left-handed and generally uses a black Rickenbacker for concerts. He is a multi-instrumentalist trained in piano.

== Musical career ==
Wilson, was born and grew up in Kinlochleven and attended the Kinlochleven High School. He always wanted to be a musician and has said that it is the only thing "he's ever done". He has said that if he couldn't be a musician, he would have worked as a music producer or teach children how to be in a band. Wilson is a multi-instrumentalist, and can play instruments such as piano, guitar, bass, drums and banjo. He went to music school to learn the piano, and in his own words, can "play most things unless they have to be blown into". He has been friends with members of Snow Patrol since 1995, during their "wilderness years".

In 2000, he joined Glasgow band Terra Diablo as guitarist. Whenever Terra Diablo supported Snow Patrol on tours, Wilson joined Snow Patrol on-stage as an unofficial member, contributing guitar and keyboards. He once joked that he agreed to tour with Snow Patrol only the condition that Terra Diablo could tour with them. Wilson left Terra Diablo in mid-February 2005, the reasons for which were not made public. On 16 March 2005, Snow Patrol bassist Mark McClelland was fired from the band. Vocalist Gary Lightbody asked Wilson to replace him. He accepted, and switched to the bass guitar when he joined the band. He played his first show as permanent member in Dingle on 1 April 2005. In October 2006, during the Eyes Open Tour, he injured his left arm and shoulder. Though wanting to continue, the band thought better and six concerts were subsequently cancelled.

Wilson also guested on Film School's 2007 album Hideout.

Wilson left Snow Patrol in September 2023 to focus on his metal project named Above as Below, releasing the song "Luna".

== Musical style ==
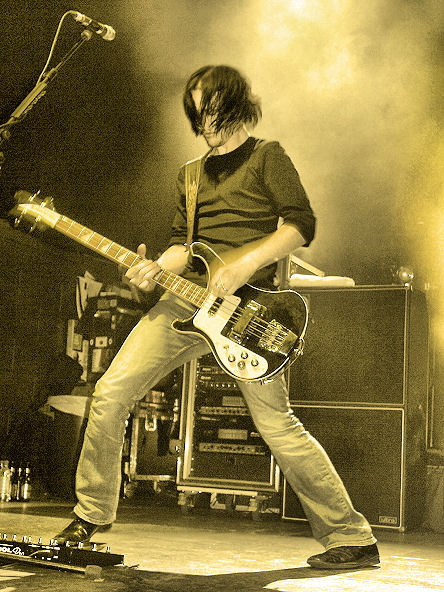
Paul Wilson with his Black Rickenbacker

His favourite instrument is the guitar, which he played for nineteen years, before switching to bass. He found the transition difficult, as he felt that one could "get away with more" playing the guitar. He finds the bass a difficult and challenging instrument to play and "express" oneself. But he enjoys playing it and likes the potential of the instrument: "By changing one note, you can make the whole thing sound a lot better". Apart from writing bass-lines for the band, Wilson occasionally contributes guitar and piano parts, and also plays keyboards live on "Just Say Yes". He writes bass-lines based on the song's rhythm and at times teams up with drummer Jonny Quinn to come up with a basic riff or simple chord changes. He plays the bass left-handed, and prefers using a pick. On-stage, he generally uses a black Rickenbacker 4000 bass.

== Personal life ==
As a child, Wilson was a huge fan of Star Wars, and owned toys of all characters. He has the name of his previous band "Terra Diablo" tattooed on the inside of his left arm.

== Musical equipment ==
Bass guitars

- Rickenbacker 4000 (Black)
- Rickenbacker 4003
- Fender Jazz Bass

Amplifiers

- Ampeg SVT–2PRO, SVT–4PRO
- Orange AD200
- Ampeg SVT–810E (Bass cabinet)

Effects

- Big Muff (distortion pedal, 2×)
- Line 6 Bass POD XT Pro

== Discography ==
with Terra Diablo

- 2001 – "The Way Things Are and How They're Meant to Be"
- 2002 – "The Smoke"
- 2004 – "Satellites"
- 2004 – "Swings & Roundabouts"
- 2004 – Terra Diablo

with Snow Patrol

- 2006 – Eyes Open
- 2008 – A Hundred Million Suns
- 2009 – Up to Now^{[A]}
- 2011 – Fallen Empires
- 2018 – Wildness

Notes

- A: When credited.
