= List of Wolfmother and Andrew Stockdale band members =

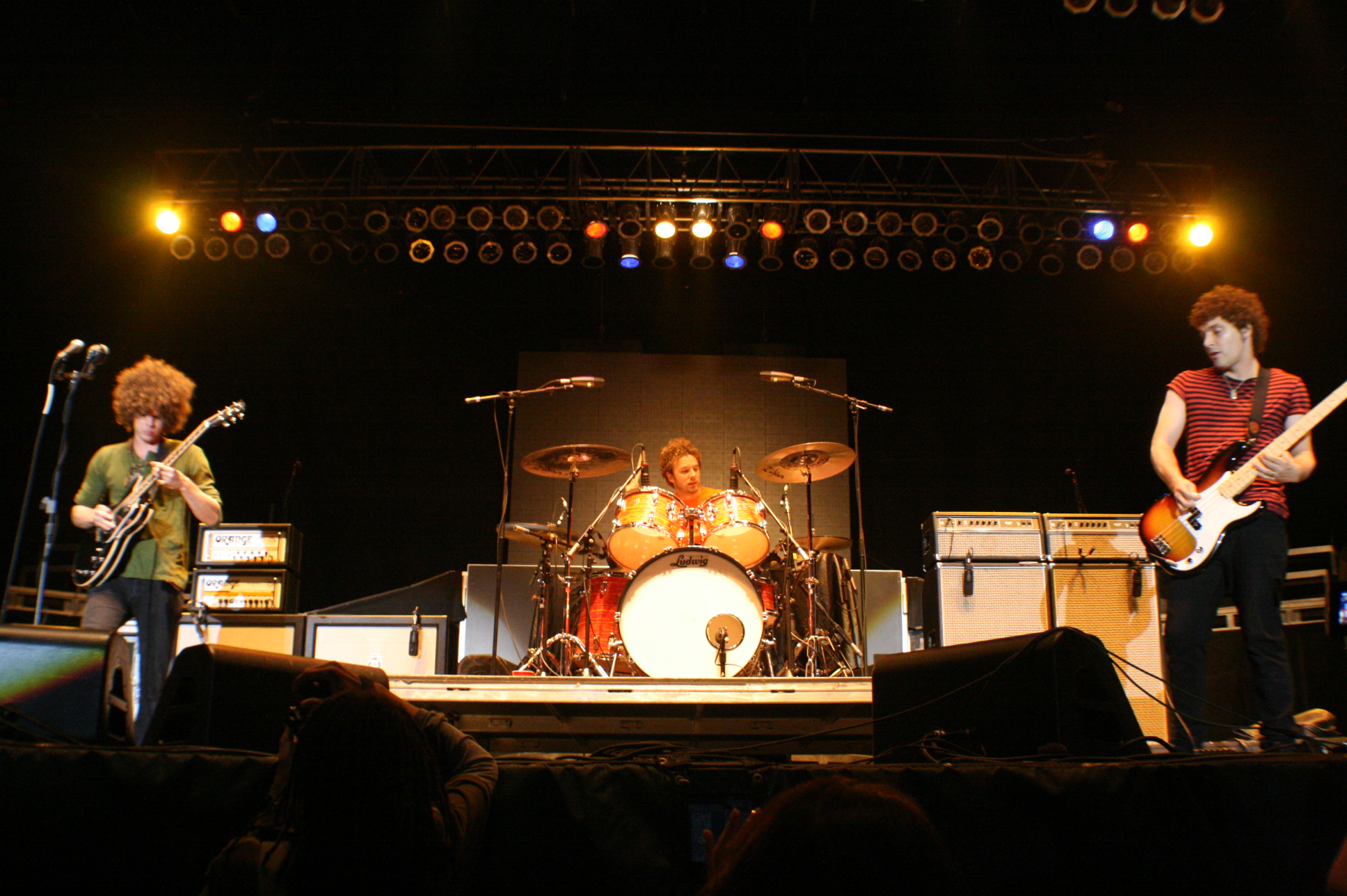
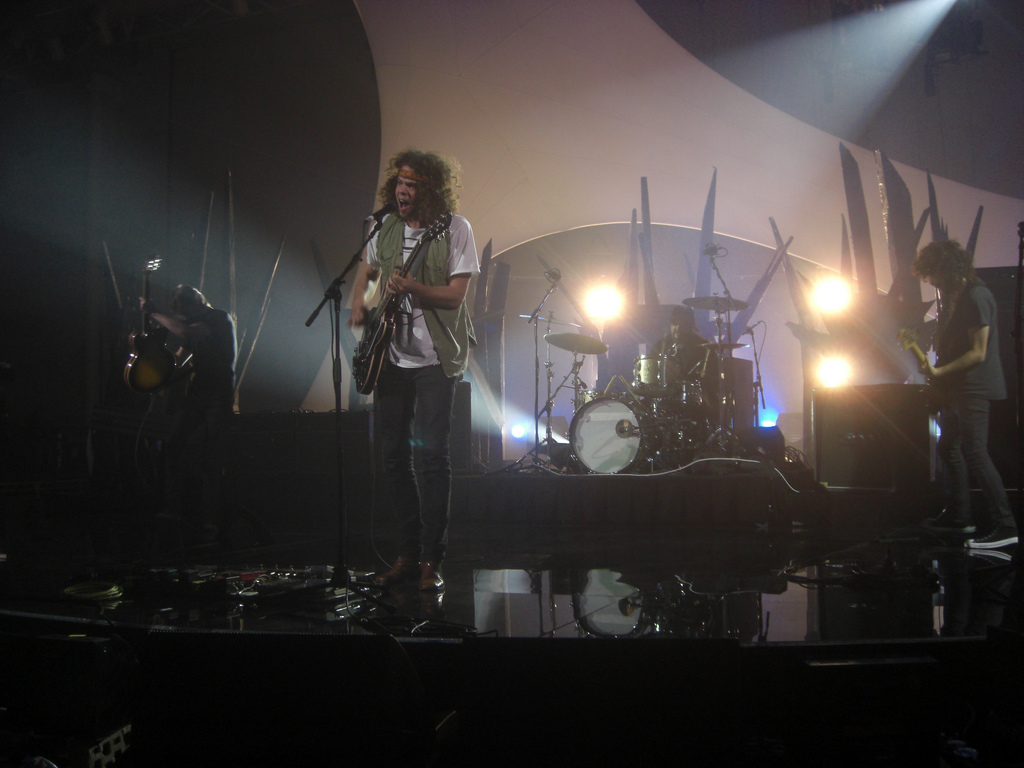
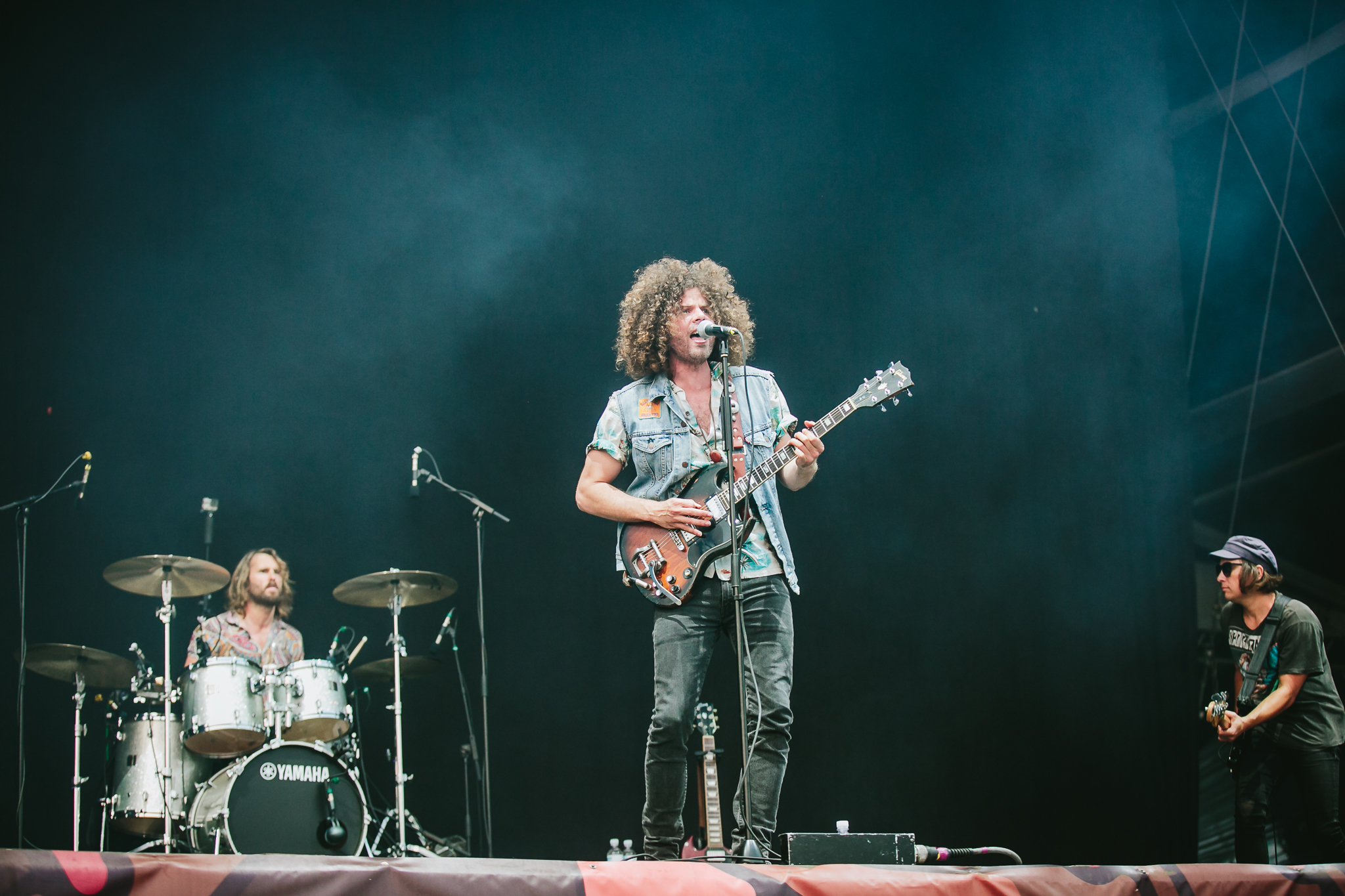
Wolfmother performing in 2007 (top), 2009 (middle) and 2018 (bottom).

Wolfmother are an Australian hard rock band from Sydney, New South Wales. Formed in 2004, the group originally included vocalist and guitarist Andrew Stockdale, bassist and keyboardist Chris Ross, and drummer Myles Heskett. The band has since gone through many lineup changes, centred around Stockdale as the sole constant member, with the current incarnation including bassist James Wassenaar and Christian Condon (both since 2023), and touring keyboardist Julia "Juulz" Driessen (intermittently since 2019).

== History ==
=== 2004–2013 ===
Andrew Stockdale, Chris Ross and Myles Heskett formed Wolfmother in 2004, after several years of jamming together. The group released their critically and commercially successful self-titled debut album in Australia in 2005, with an international release following the next year. Work soon began on a follow-up, however in August 2008 both Ross and Heskett left Wolfmother due to "irreconcilable personal and musical differences". Stockdale recorded "Back Round" with Resin Dogs drummer Dave Atkins later in the year, before unveiling the full new lineup early the next year, which also included Ian Peres on bass and keyboards, and Aidan Nemeth on rhythm guitar.

The second lineup's only album Cosmic Egg was released in 2009. After touring in promotion of the release, Atkins left Wolfmother in March 2010. The following month, he was replaced by Will Rockwell-Scott, formerly of the Mooney Suzuki. The group began working on the follow-up to Cosmic Egg in early 2011, however in February the next year it was announced that both Nemeth and Rockwell-Scott had recently quit the band. They were replaced by Vin Steele and former Vines drummer Hamish Rosser, respectively, while multi-instrumentalist Elliott Hammond was also added. Keep Moving was completed and released in 2013, credited as a Stockdale solo release.

=== Since 2013 ===
Stockdale revived the Wolfmother moniker just a few months after retiring it, before Rosser left the band in June 2013. Hammond briefly took over on drums, before also leaving the next month. A third drummer in as many months, Tony McCall, lasted only a few weeks in the group. The band subsequently reverted to a trio with Steele switching over to drums, and in 2014 they released their third album New Crown. Steele had left by early 2015, with the Voidz and former Nine Inch Nails drummer Alex Carapetis taking his place for tour dates in April and May. For shows later in the year, Atkins took over on drums. For their fourth album Victorious, Stockdale and Peres were joined by session drummers Josh Freese and Joey Waronker. Carapetis returned for the subsequent Gypsy Caravan Tour.

By June 2017, Hamish Rosser had returned to the band. Long-term member Peres left Wolfmother in early 2018, committing to tour dates with Xavier Rudd instead. For their appearance at Mojo Burning Festival in April, the band played with Dave Atkins on rhythm guitar, Hobo Magic bassist Jake Bennett and an extra keyboardist. Starting in May, the band toured with bassist Brad Heald and keyboardist Lachy Doley, the latter of whom was replaced later in the year by Katie McGurl. In the summer of 2019, Juulz Driessen joined the band as a touring keyboard player. She contributed to several live shows in 2019 and again in 2022. From late 2019, the band's touring lineup comprised Stockdale, bassist and keyboardist Bobby Poulton, and drummer Brett "Wolfie" Wolfenden. In early 2021, Rosser returned again while bassist Alex McConnell joined the band. McConnell was replaced by a returning Poulton in November 2021.

In 2023, the rhythm section was replaced by James Wassenaar (bass) and Christian Condon (drums). From 2026 onward, Juulz Driessen became the band’s touring keyboard player again. James Wassenaar joined on bass guitar in 2022.

== Members ==
=== Current ===
Image	Name	Years active	Instruments	Release contributions
	Andrew Stockdale	2004–present	vocals; guitars; bass (2015–18, studio only)	all Wolfmother and Andrew Stockdale solo releases
	Brett "Wolfie" Wolfenden	2019–2021; 2026–present	drums	
	Juulz Driessen	2026–present (touring 2019)	keyboards	
	James Wassenaar	2023–present	bass	none to date

=== Former ===
Image	Name	Years active	Instruments	Release contributions
	Chris Ross	2004–2008	bass; keyboards	all Wolfmother releases from Wolfmother (2004) to Please Experience Wolfmother Live (2007)
	Myles Heskett	2004–2008	drums	all Wolfmother releases from Wolfmother (2004) to Please Experience Wolfmother Live (2007)
	Dave Atkins	2008–2010 (touring 2011, 2015, 2016 and 2018)	drums; bass and keyboards (2016); rhythm guitar (2018)	Cosmic Egg (2009); "Fell Down a Hole" (2010); iTunes Live from Sydney (2010); Keep Moving (2013); Slipstream (2018)
	Ian Peres	2009–2018	bass; keyboards; backing vocals	all Wolfmother and Andrew Stockdale releases from Cosmic Egg (2009) to "Happy Wolfmother's Day" (2018)
	Aidan Nemeth	2009–2012	rhythm guitar	Cosmic Egg (2009); iTunes Live from Sydney (2010); "Fell Down a Hole" (2010); "Cheap Sunglasses" (2011); Keep Moving (2013)
	Will Rockwell-Scott	2010–2011	drums	"Cheap Sunglasses" (2011) ''Keep Moving'' (2013)
	Vin Steele	2012–2015	rhythm guitar (2012–13, 2015); drums (2013–15)	Keep Moving (2013); "Highway" (2013); New Crown (2014)
	Hamish Rosser	2012–2013; 2017–2019 (touring only); 2021–2022	drums	Keep Moving (2013); Rock Out (2021)
	Elliott Hammond	2012–2013	keyboards, harmonica and congas (2012–13); drums (2013)	Keep Moving (2013)
	Bobby Poulton	2019–2021; 2021–2022	bass; keyboards; backing vocals	none
	Christian Condon	2023–2026	drums	none
	Alexx McConnell	2021	bass	Rock Out (2021) – two tracks only

=== Touring ===
Image	Name	Years active	Instruments	Details
	Tony McCall	2013	drums	McCall replaced Elliott Hammond on drums in July 2013, but within a few weeks had left the band again.
	Alex Carapetis	2015; 2016–2017	drums	Carapetis replaced Vin Steele on drums for Groovin' the Moo in 2015 and returned later for the Gypsy Caravan Tour.
	Jake Bennett	2018	bass	Bennett performed bass at the Mojo Burning Festival in April 2018, alongside Dave Atkins on rhythm guitar.
	Brad Heald	2018–2019	bass	Heald replaced Ian Peres in early 2018 and remained a constant member of the band for over a year.
	Lachy Doley	2018; 2019	keyboards	Doley joined Wolfmother's touring lineup alongside Brad Heald in May 2018, performing on their European tour.
	Katie McGurl	2018	keyboards	McGurl took over from Doley in September 2018 for the band's North American tour, which ended in November.
	Leo Munoz	2019	keyboards	Munoz took over from Doley in May 2019, and later Driessen took over starting with shows in July.
	Juulz Driessen	2019, 2026-present	keyboards	Munoz took over from Doley in May 2019, and later Driessen took over starting with shows in July.
	Jesper Albers	2023	drums; backing vocals	Members of Paceshifters joined Andrew for the Wolfmother 2023 European Tour.
	Paul Dokman	2023	bass; backing vocals	Members of Paceshifters joined Andrew for the Wolfmother 2023 European Tour.
	Seb Dokman	2023	guitar; backing vocals	Members of Paceshifters joined Andrew for the Wolfmother 2023 European Tour.

== Lineups ==
Period	Members	Releases
Early 2004 – August 2008	Andrew Stockdale – vocals, guitar; Chris Ross – bass, keyboards; Myles Heskett – drums	Wolfmother (2005); "Pleased to Meet You" (2007); Please Experience Wolfmother Live (2007)
November 2008 – January 2009	Andrew Stockdale – vocals, guitar, bass; Dave Atkins – drums	"Back Round" (2009)
January 2009 – March 2010	Andrew Stockdale – lead vocals, lead guitar; Dave Atkins – drums; Ian Peres – bass, keyboards, backing vocals; Aidan Nemeth – rhythm guitar	Cosmic Egg (2009); "Fell Down a Hole" (2010); iTunes Live from Sydney (2010)
April 2010 – November 2011	Andrew Stockdale – lead vocals, lead guitar; Ian Peres – bass, keyboards, backing vocals; Aidan Nemeth – rhythm guitar; Will Rockwell-Scott – drums	"Cheap Sunglasses" (2010); Keep Moving (2013)
December 2011	Andrew Stockdale – lead vocals, lead guitar; Ian Peres – bass, keyboards, backing vocals; Aidan Nemeth – rhythm guitar; Dave Atkins – drums (touring only)	none
February 2012 – June 2013	Andrew Stockdale – lead vocals, lead guitar; Ian Peres – bass, keyboards, backing vocals; Vin Steele – rhythm guitar; Elliott Hammond – keyboards, harmonica; Hamish Rosser – drums	Keep Moving (2013)
June – July 2013	Andrew Stockdale – lead vocals, lead guitar; Ian Peres – bass, keyboards, backing vocals; Vin Steele – rhythm guitar; Elliott Hammond – drums, percussion	Keep Moving (2013)
July – August 2013	Andrew Stockdale – lead vocals, lead guitar; Ian Peres – bass, keyboards, backing vocals; Vin Steele – rhythm guitar; Tony McCall – drums (touring only)	none
August 2013 – April 2015	Andrew Stockdale – lead vocals, guitar; Ian Peres – bass, keyboards, backing vocals; Vin Steele – drums	"Highway" (2013); New Crown (2014)
April 2015	Andrew Stockdale – lead vocals, guitar; Ian Peres – bass, keyboards, backing vocals; Vin Steele – rhythm guitar; Alex Carapetis – drums (touring only)	none
April – May 2015	Andrew Stockdale – lead vocals, guitar; Ian Peres – bass, keyboards, backing vocals; Alex Carapetis – drums (touring only)	none
September – December 2015	Andrew Stockdale – lead vocals, guitar; Ian Peres – bass, keyboards, backing vocals; Dave Atkins – drums (touring only)	none
February 2016 – May 2017	Andrew Stockdale – lead vocals, guitar; Ian Peres – bass, keyboards, backing vocals; Alex Carapetis – drums (touring only)	none
June 2017 – early 2018	Andrew Stockdale – lead vocals, guitar; Ian Peres – bass, keyboards, backing vocals; Hamish Rosser – drums (touring only)	"Freedom Is Mine" (2017); "Happy Wolfmother's Day" (2018)
April 2018	Andrew Stockdale – vocals, lead guitar; Hamish Rosser – drums (touring only); Dave Atkins – rhythm guitar (touring only); Jake Bennett – bass (touring only); Unknown musician – keyboards (touring only)	none
May – July 2018	Andrew Stockdale – vocals, guitar; Hamish Rosser – drums (touring only); Brad Heald – bass (touring only); Lachy Doley – keyboards (touring only)	none
September – November 2018	Andrew Stockdale – vocals, guitar; Hamish Rosser – drums (touring only); Brad Heald – bass (touring only); Katie McGurl – keyboards (touring only)	none
December 2018 – April 2019	Andrew Stockdale – vocals, guitar; Brad Heald – bass (touring only); Hamish Rosser – drums (touring only)	none
May – June 2019	Andrew Stockdale – vocals, guitar; Hamish Rosser – drums (touring only); Brad Heald – bass (touring only); Leo Munoz – keyboards (touring only)	none
July 2019 – October 2019	Andrew Stockdale – vocals, guitar; Hamish Rosser – drums (touring only); Brad Heald – bass (touring only); Juulz Driessen – keyboards (touring only)	none
October 2019 – early 2021	Andrew Stockdale – vocals, guitar; Bobby Poulton – bass, keyboards, backing vocals; Brett Wolfie – drums	"Higher" (2019); "Chase the Feeling" (2019); Rock'n'Roll Baby (2019); "High on My Own Supply" (2020)
Early 2021 – late 2021	Andrew Stockdale – vocals, guitar, bass; Alexx McConnell – bass; Hamish Rosser – drums	Rock Out (2021)
Late 2021 – late 2023	Andrew Stockdale – vocals, guitar; Hamish Rosser – drums; Bobby Poulton – bass, keyboards, backing vocals; Juulz Driessen - keyboards	none
January 2023 (with Paceshifter)	Andrew Stockdale – vocals, guitar; Seb Dokman – guitar, backing vocals; Paul Dokman – bass, backing vocals; Jesper Albers – drums, backing vocals	none
Early 2024 – present	Andrew Stockdale – vocals, guitar; James Wassenaar – bass; Christian Condon – drums; Juulz Driessen - keyboards	none to date
