= Keep Moving =

Keep Moving may refer to:

- Keep Moving (Madness album), 1984
- Keep Moving (Novi Split album), 2004
- Keep Moving (Andrew Stockdale album), 2013
- Keep Moving (EP), an EP by Andrew Stockdale
- Keep Moving (Adam Deacon and Bashy song), a song by Adam Deacon and Bashy, featuring Paloma Faith
- Keep Moving (MØ song), 2025
- "Keep Movin", a 1963 single by Sounds Incorporated
- "Keep Moving", by Moka Only from The Desired Effect, 2005
- "Keep Moving", a song by Ivy from the album In the Clear
- Keep Moving Tour, a cancelled concert tour by Andrew Stockdale
