= Keep Moving Tour =

Cancelled 2013 concert tour by Andrew Stockdale

- Cancelled tour by Andrew Stockdale
- Location: Australia; United States
- Associated album: Keep Moving
- Start date: 7 June 2013
- End date: 29 June 2013
- Legs: 2
- No. of shows: 38

The Keep Moving Tour is a cancelled concert tour by Australian hard rock musician Andrew Stockdale in support of his debut solo album Keep Moving. The tour was scheduled for two legs in Australia and the United States between July and August 2013, but as of 21 July 2013 the entire tour is cancelled.

== Background ==
Andrew Stockdale originally announced his debut solo tour in April 2013, scheduling 14 shows for the opening Australian leg between 6 and 29 June. The support act was later announced as The Delta Riggs, featuring Stockdale band member Elliott Hammond. In June however, the day before the first scheduled show in Newcastle, New South Wales, Stockdale announced that the Australian leg of the tour had been postponed due to "international commitments", with only the album launch show at The Metro Theatre in Sydney remaining. The tour would later visit the United States for 24 shows throughout July and August.

In July 2013, it was announced that all Andrew Stockdale Keep Moving tour dates had been cancelled, and that his old band Wolfmother would reunite to perform a number of shows in the United States. As of 21 July 2013, it is not yet known whether any of the Keep Moving shows will be rescheduled, either as Andrew Stockdale or as Wolfmother.

== Set list ==
The following is the set list from the 7 June 2013 concert at The Metro Theatre in Sydney, New South Wales.

1. "Somebody's Calling"
2. "Long Way to Go"
3. "Keep Moving"
4. "Woman"
5. "White Unicorn"
6. "New Moon Rising"
7. "Let Somebody Love You"
8. "Everyday Drone"
9. "Suitcase (One More Time)"
10. "Apple Tree"
11. "White Feather"
12. "Vicarious"
13. "Colossal"
14. "Joker & the Thief"

Encore

15. "Dimension"

== Tour dates ==
Date	City	Country	Venue	Support act(s)
Leg 1: Australia
7 June 2013	Sydney	Australia	The Metro Theatre	The Bob Harrow Band
6 June 2013	Newcastle	Australia	Bar on the Hill	The Delta Riggs
8 June 2013	Wollongong	Australia	Waves Nightclub	The Delta Riggs
13 June 2013	Melbourne	Australia	Ferntree Gully Hotel	The Delta Riggs
14 June 2013	Melbourne	Australia	The Hi-Fi	The Delta Riggs
15 June 2013	Geelong	Australia	The Wool Exchange	The Delta Riggs
16 June 2013	Melbourne	Australia	Pier Hotel	The Delta Riggs
19 June 2013	Adelaide	Australia	The Gov	The Delta Riggs
20 June 2013	Perth	Australia	The Bakery Artrage Complex	The Delta Riggs
21 June 2013	Fremantle	Australia	Fly by Night Club	The Delta Riggs
22 June 2013	Perth	Australia	Prince of Wales Hotel	The Delta Riggs
27 June 2013	Brisbane	Australia	The Hi-Fi	The Delta Riggs
28 June 2013	Gold Coast	Australia	Coolangatta Hotel	The Delta Riggs
29 June 2013	Byron Bay	Australia	The Northern	The Delta Riggs
Leg 2: United States
26 July 2013	Dallas	United States	Trees	Not announced
27 July 2013	Austin	United States	Emo's East	Not announced
28 July 2013	Houston	United States	House of Blues	Not announced
29 July 2013	New Orleans	United States	One Eyed Jacks	Not announced
31 July 2013	Nashville	United States	Exit/In	Not announced
1 August 2013	Atlanta	United States	The Masquerade	Not announced
2 August 2013	Asheville	United States	The Orange Peel	Not announced
3 August 2013	Washington, D.C.	United States	U Street Music Hall	Not announced
5 August 2013	Boston	United States	Brighton Music Hall	Not announced
6 August 2013	New York City	United States	Bowery Ballroom	Not announced
7 August 2013	New York City	United States	Music Hall of Williamsburg	Not announced
9 August 2013	Philadelphia	United States	Union Transfer	Not announced
10 August 2013	Pittsburgh	United States	Mr Smalls Theatre	Not announced
12 August 2013	Detroit	United States	Magic Stick	Not announced
13 August 2013	Chicago	United States	Double Door	Not announced
15 August 2013	St. Louis	United States	The Firebird	Not announced
16 August 2013	Kansas City	United States	The Riot Room	Not announced
17 August 2013	Denver	United States	Bluebird Theater	Not announced
18 August 2013	Aspen	United States	Belly Up	Not announced
21 August 2013	Portland	United States	Doug Fir Lounge	Not announced
22 August 2013	Seattle	United States	Neumos	Not announced
24 August 2013	San Francisco	United States	The Independent	Not announced
25 August 2013	West Hollywood	United States	Troubadour	Not announced
26 August 2013	Solana Beach	United States	Belly Up	Not announced

== Personnel ==
- Andrew Stockdale – lead vocals, lead guitar
- Ian Peres – bass, keyboards, backing vocals
- Vin Steele – rhythm guitar
- Elliott Hammond – drums
