= Long Way to Go =

Long Way to Go may refer to:

- "Long Way to Go" (Alan Jackson song), 2011
- "Long Way to Go" (Andrew Stockdale song), 2013
- "Long Way to Go" (Gwen Stefani and André 3000 song), 2004
- "Long Way to Go" (Stevie Nicks song), 1989
- "Long Way 2 Go", a song by Cassie, 2006
- "Long Way to Go", a song by Alice Cooper from Love It to Death, 1971
- "Long Way to Go", a song by Ben Folds from So There, 2015
- "Long Way to Go", a song by Josh Gracin from Redemption, 2011
- "Long Way to Go", a song by Pink from Trustfall, 2023

== See also ==
- "Long, Long Way to Go", a 2003 song by Def Leppard
