= Keep Moving (EP) =

EP by Andrew Stockdale
- Released: 26 April 2013
- Recorded: 2012–2013 at Rockinghorse Studios and Andrew Stockdale's home studio (Byron Bay, New South Wales)
- Genre: Hard rock, blues rock
- Length: 16:19
- Label: Universal
- Producer: Andrew Stockdale

Andrew Stockdale chronology
Keep Moving (2013)	Keep Moving (2013)

Keep Moving is the debut solo extended play (EP) by Australian musician Andrew Stockdale. Recorded throughout 2012 and 2013 in Byron Bay, the EP features four songs from Stockdale's debut solo album of the same name. It was released by Universal on 26 April 2013 in Australia, Germany and Austria, on 28 April in the United Kingdom and the rest of Europe, and on 30 April in the United States.

== Track listing ==
All tracks are written by Andrew Stockdale

No.	Title	Length
1.	"Long Way to Go"	4:47
2.	"Keep Moving"	3:00
3.	"Somebody's Calling"	3:48
4.	"Everyday Drone"	4:44
Total length:		16:19

== Personnel ==
- Andrew Stockdale – vocals, guitars, organ (track 3)
- Ian Peres – bass, organ and Wurlitzer electric piano (track 1)
- Elliott Hammond – Wurlitzer electric piano and bongos (track 1), drums (track 3)
- Vin Steele – rhythm guitar (tracks 1 and 4)
- Hamish Rosser – drums (tracks 1 and 4)
- Will Rockwell-Scott – drums (track 2)
- Alex "Rudy" Markwell – rhythm guitar (track 3)

== Release history ==
Region	Date	Label	Format	Ref.
Australia	26 April 2013	Universal Music Group	Digital download	
Germany	26 April 2013	Universal Music Group	Digital download	
Austria	26 April 2013	Universal Music Group	Digital download	
United Kingdom	28 April 2013	Universal Music Group	Digital download	
Europe	28 April 2013	Universal Music Group	Digital download	
United States	30 April 2013	Universal Music Group	Digital download	
