= Gypsy Caravan Tour =

2016 concert tour by Wolfmother

- World tour by Wolfmother
- Promotional poster for the opening North American leg of the tour
- Location: North America; Europe
- Associated album: Victorious
- Start date: 24 February 2016
- End date: 22 May 2016
- Legs: 3
- No. of shows: 56

Wolfmother concert chronology
- New Crown Tour (2014); Gypsy Caravan Tour (2016)

The Gypsy Caravan Tour was a worldwide concert tour by Australian hard rock band Wolfmother. Staged in promotion of their 2016 fourth studio album Victorious and named after a song on the album, it is visiting clubs and theatres throughout 2016. The tour began with a North American leg starting in Minneapolis on 24 February, which will be followed by a run of shows in Europe from 8 April. In the summer, the band will perform at a number of festivals in the United States, including Rock on the Range in Columbus, Ohio.

== Background ==
The opening North American leg of the Gypsy Caravan Tour was first announced in November 2015 along with the announcement of the album Victorious. At the time of the announcement, the band's frontman Andrew Stockdale noted that the drummer on the tour would be dependent on the schedules of various people, with Cosmic Egg drummer Dave Atkins a possibility. It was later revealed that Alex Carapetis, who played with the band at a number of shows in 2015, would be returning to the group to play drums on the tour.

For the opening North American leg, Wolfmother were supported by Los Angeles-based alternative rock duo Deap Vally. For the European leg starting 8 April 2016, Cincinnati hard rock group Electric Citizen were the opening act.

== Set list ==
The following is the set list from the band's performance on 24 February 2016, which is representative of completed dates on the tour.

1. "Victorious"
2. "New Moon Rising"
3. "Woman"
4. "Apple Tree"
5. "The Love That You Give"
6. "White Unicorn"
7. "California Queen"
8. "How Many Times"
9. "Gypsy Caravan"
10. "Dimension"
11. "The Simple Life"
12. "Mind's Eye"
13. "Colossal"

Encore

14. "Vagabond"
15. "Joker & the Thief"

On 5 March 2016, the band played a different set list for the first time on the tour.

1. "Dimension"
2. "Victorious"
3. "New Moon Rising"
4. "Woman"
5. "Apple Tree"
6. "The Love That You Give"
7. "White Unicorn"
8. "I Ain't Got No"
9. "California Queen"
10. "How Many Times"
11. "Gypsy Caravan"
12. "The Simple Life"
13. "Mind's Eye"
14. "Pyramid"
15. "Colossal"

Encore

16. "Vagabond"
17. "Joker & the Thief"

== Tour dates ==
Date	City	Country	Venue	Opening act
North America
24 February 2016	Minneapolis	United States	First Avenue	Deap Vally
25 February 2016	Chicago	United States	Metro Chicago	Deap Vally
26 February 2016	Detroit	United States	Saint Andrew's Hall	Deap Vally
27 February 2016	Toronto	Canada	Danforth Music Hall	Deap Vally
29 February 2016	Boston	United States	Paradise Rock Club	Deap Vally
2 March 2016	Washington, D.C.	United States	9:30 Club	Deap Vally
3 March 2016	New York City	United States	Webster Hall	Deap Vally
4 March 2016	Philadelphia	United States	Trocadero Theatre	Deap Vally
5 March 2016	Raleigh	United States	The Ritz	Deap Vally
7 March 2016	Atlanta	United States	Center Stage Atlanta	Deap Vally
8 March 2016	Nashville	United States	Marathon Music Works	Deap Vally
9 March 2016	Memphis	United States	Minglewood Hall	Deap Vally
11 March 2016	Lawrence	United States	Granada Theater	Deap Vally
12 March 2016	Oklahoma City	United States	Diamond Ballroom	Deap Vally
14 March 2016	Dallas	United States	Granada Theater	Deap Vally
15 March 2016	Houston	United States	House of Blues Houston	Deap Vally
18 March 2016 (Note: The 18 March 2016 concert in Texas is part of South by Southwest.)	Austin	United States	Lady Bird Lake	Coheed and Cambria (headline)
21 March 2016	El Paso	United States	Tricky Falls	Deap Vally
23 March 2016	San Diego	United States	House of Blues San Diego	Deap Vally
25 March 2016	Santa Ana	United States	The Observatory	Deap Vally
26 March 2016	Los Angeles	United States	The Fonda Theatre	Deap Vally
28 March 2016	San Francisco	United States	The Fillmore	Deap Vally
30 March 2016	Portland	United States	Wonder Ballroom	Deap Vally
31 March 2016	Seattle	United States	The Showbox	Deap Vally
1 April 2016	Vancouver	Canada	Commodore Ballroom	Deap Vally
Europe
8 April 2016	Dublin	Ireland	Olympia Theatre	Electric Citizen
9 April 2016	Manchester	England	Manchester Academy	Electric Citizen
10 April 2016	Newcastle	England	O_{2} Academy Newcastle	Electric Citizen
12 April 2016	Glasgow	Scotland	O_{2} Academy Glasgow	Electric Citizen
13 April 2016	Leeds	England	O_{2} Academy Leeds	Electric Citizen
14 April 2016	Nottingham	England	Rock City	Electric Citizen
16 April 2016	Birmingham	England	O_{2} Academy Birmingham	Electric Citizen
17 April 2016	Bristol	England	O_{2} Academy Bristol	Electric Citizen
18 April 2016	Southampton	England	O_{2} Guildhall Southampton	Electric Citizen
20 April 2016 (Note: The 20 April 2016 concert was relocated from Shepherd's Bush Empire to The Forum, London)	London	England	The Forum, London	Electric Citizen
22 April 2016	Cologne	Germany	Köln Palladium	Electric Citizen
23 April 2016	Wiesbaden	Germany	Schlachthof	Electric Citizen
25 April 2016	Paris	France	Le Trianon	Electric Citizen
26 April 2016	Amsterdam	Netherlands	Paradiso	Electric Citizen
27 April 2016	Brussels	Belgium	Ancienne Belgique	Electric Citizen
29 April 2016	Groningen	Netherlands	Oosterpoort	Electric Citizen
30 April 2016	Tilburg	Netherlands	013	Electric Citizen
1 May 2016	Hamburg	Germany	Große Freiheit 36	Electric Citizen
2 May 2016	Berlin	Germany	Columbiahalle	Electric Citizen
4 May 2016	Copenhagen	Denmark	Vega	Electric Citizen
5 May 2016	Oslo	Norway	Rockefeller Music Hall	Electric Citizen
6 May 2016	Stockholm	Sweden	Gröna Lund	Electric Citizen
8 May 2016	Milan	Italy	Discoteca Alcatraz Milano	Electric Citizen
9 May 2016	Zürich	Switzerland	Volkshaus	Electric Citizen
10 May 2016	Munich	Germany	Kesselhaus	Electric Citizen
11 May 2016	Vienna	Austria	Vienna Wien	Electric Citizen
13 May 2016	Barcelona	Spain	Apollo Club	Electric Citizen
14 May 2016 (Note: The 14 May 2016 concert in Bilbao is a part of Kristonfest.)	Bilbao	Spain	Santana 27	—
North America
20 May 2016 (Note: The 20 May 2016 concert in Schaghticoke is part of Rock 'n Derby.)	Schaghticoke	United States	Schaghticoke Fairgrounds	—
21 May 2016 (Note: The 21 May 2016 concert in Camden is part of MMR*B*Q.)	Camden	United States	BB&T Pavilion	—
22 May 2016 (Note: The 22 May 2016 concert in Columbus is part of Rock on the Range.)	Columbus	United States	Mapfre Stadium	—

== Personnel ==
- Andrew Stockdale – lead vocals, guitar
- Ian Peres – bass, keyboards, backing vocals
- Alex Carapetis – drums
