= Skinny Blonde =

Beer

- Introduced: 2008
- Style: Blonde ale

Skinny Blonde is a low-carb blonde ale started by The Vines drummer Hamish Rosser, winemaker Richie Harkham and artist Jarod Taylor. The beer is currently sold in Australia, and took home the 'Peoples Choice' awards at the 2008 Australian Beer Festival held at The Rocks in Sydney.

== Controversies ==
In June 2009, Skinny Blonde attracted controversy across Australia over its beer bottle packaging which - through the use of modern ink technology - has a 1950s style pin-up girl called 'Daisy' on the beer bottle label slowly revealing herself as the beer level drops and the bottle temperature rises.

The label has angered some health and women's groups who claimed, "This is another blatant example of the alcohol industry objectifying women to move product". Women's Forum Australia spokeswoman Melinda Tankard was quoted as saying: "This is demeaning, inappropriate and troubling." Rosser responded, "This generation of Aussies have grown up on the beach and topless girls in bikinis are commonplace. The label and website is in no way meant to offend women or anyone else, rather embrace the Australian beach culture." He was also quoted as saying that the beer was "just a bit of cheeky fun."

The much smaller Oban Bay Brewery in Scotland, which started production in 2009 using a 5 barrel plant, also produce a blonde ale called "Skinny Blonde".

== See also ==
- List of breweries in Australia
