= Ian Peres =

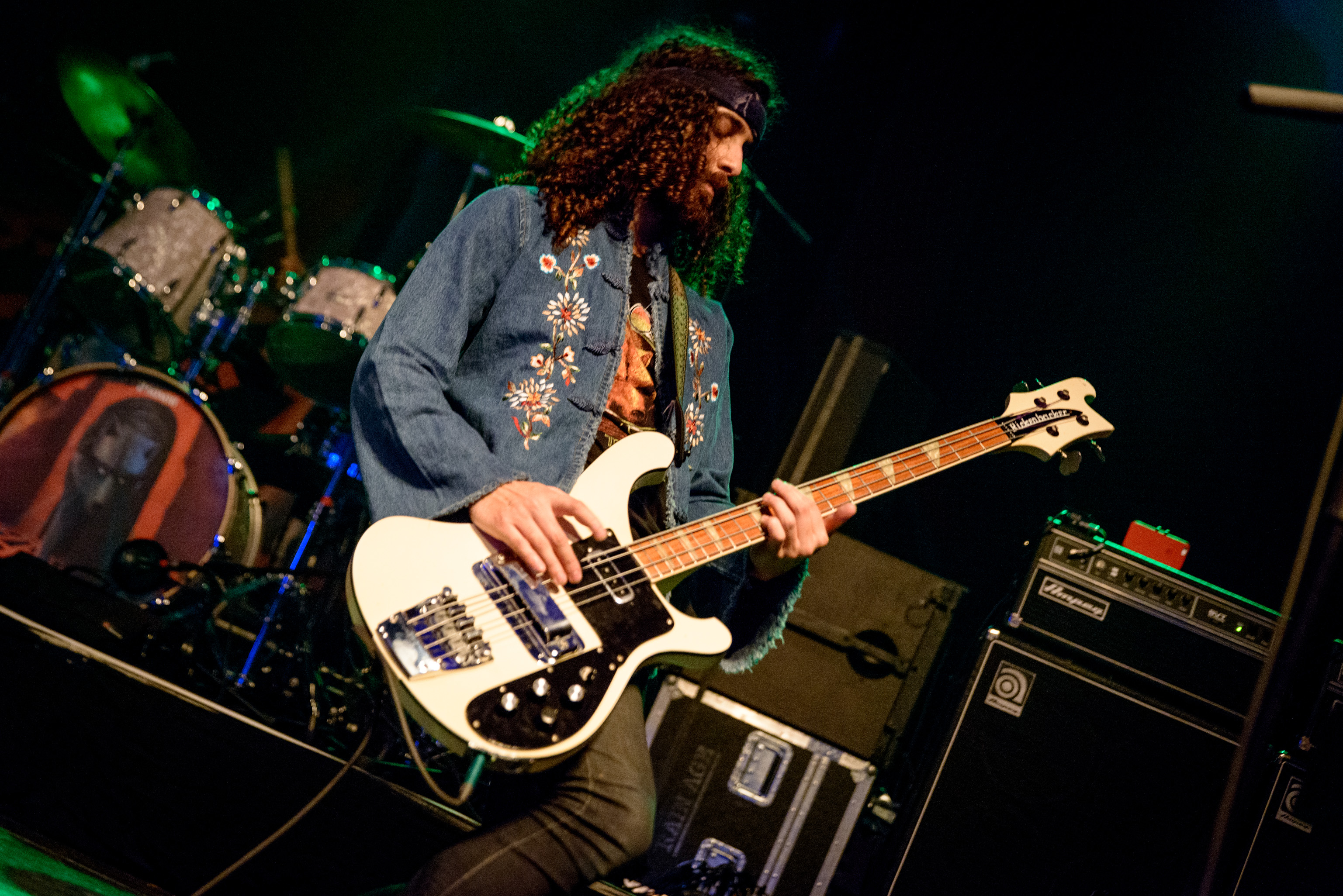
- Ian Peres playing bass with Wolfmother on tour in Munich in 2016.

Background information
- Born: Gold Coast, Queensland, Australia
- Genres: Hard rock; stoner rock; neo-psychedelia; blues rock
- Occupation: Musician
- Instruments: Bass; keyboards
- Years active: 2009–present
- Labels: Modular; Universal; Interscope; Island
- Formerly of: Wolfmother

Ian Peres is an Australian rock musician and multi-instrumentalist. He is the bassist and keyboardist of the hard rock band Wolfmother. Peres joined the band in January 2009 as Andrew Stockdale found new members after Chris Ross and Myles Heskett quit in 2008. The same year that Peres joined Wolfmother, the band released their second studio album Cosmic Egg.

== Career ==
In an interview with Toazted in 2011, Stockdale revealed that former drummer Dave Atkins had suggested Ian Peres when the band were looking for a bassist. Peres responded by saying that he was "very excited by the prospect of playing with a band that he had always admired in the past." Peres has played bass and keyboards in both Cosmic Egg and New Crown; the band's second and third albums respectively. Peres contributed towards the engineering, editing and audio mixing in New Crown along with Kevin Garcia Fernandez.

In between the release of the band's second and third studio album, Peres worked with bandmate Andrew Stockdale for the release of his debut solo record Keep Moving, which was originally intended to be a Wolfmother record. During this period, the band briefly split up before cancelling Stockdale's tour for his solo album and within a few months of the release of the record, Wolfmother was reformed. Peres recorded bass, organ, piano and banjo, whilst also contributing with Pro Tools editing on Keep Moving.

After the release of New Crown in 2014, Wolfmother released their fourth studio album Victorious in February 2016. With Stockdale recording bass on all tracks of the album, Peres contributed with only organ tracks. However, he toured with the band during their worldwide Gypsy Caravan Tour of their newly released album, where he performed backing vocals for the first time during his ongoing reign with Wolfmother.

In recent years, Peres has toured and performed with musicians including Jarryd James, Ash Grunwald and Xavier Rudd.

In June 2022, it was announced that he would be joining The Whitlams after being the session bassist on their latest album Sancho.

== Equipment ==
Peres plays Korg keyboards, primarily a Korg CX-3. He has also been seen playing Mosrite and Fender bass guitars. He mostly plays the Fender Precision Bass.

== Discography ==
Studio albums

with Wolfmother

- Cosmic Egg (2009)
- New Crown (2014)
- Victorious (2016)

with Andrew Stockdale

- Keep Moving (2013) AUS #32
