= New Crown =

Studio album by Wolfmother
- Released: 23 March 2014
- Recorded: July–December 2013
- Studio: Mates Rehearsal Studios (Los Angeles, California); The Shed (Byron Bay, New South Wales)
- Genre: Hard rock; psychedelic rock; blues rock; heavy metal
- Length: 41:05
- Label: Self-released
- Producer: Andrew Stockdale

Wolfmother chronology
Cosmic Egg (2009)	New Crown (2014)	Victorious (2016)

New Crown is the third studio album by Australian hard rock band Wolfmother. Recorded at Mates Rehearsal Studio in Los Angeles, California and The Shed in Byron Bay, New South Wales, it was produced by the band's frontman Andrew Stockdale and self-released on 23 March 2014, initially as a digital download only available on Bandcamp. It was later reissued physically.

After Wolfmother frontman Andrew Stockdale released the band's planned third album Keep Moving under his own name in 2013, the band returned with a lineup featuring Stockdale, bassist and keyboardist Ian Peres, and drummer Vin Steele later in the year. New Crown was recorded throughout the second half of the year, with Peres and Kevin Garcia Fernandez engineering the release.

New Crown received mixed reviews from critics. The musical styles exhibited on the songs, all of which were written by Stockdale, were praised on their own merit, but the album was criticised for its low production values and poor audio fidelity. Despite having no label support and little promotion, New Crown reached number 160 on the US Billboard 200 chart.

== Background and recording ==
Following the release of Keep Moving, which was credited to Andrew Stockdale as a solo album despite featuring former members of Wolfmother, it was announced in July 2013 that the band would be reforming. Following additional lineup changes, including the departure of Elliott Hammond who had performed on Keep Moving, the band began recording their third studio album in Los Angeles, California. Recording took place at the Mates Rehearsal Studio, as well as Stockdale's own studio The Shed in Byron Bay, New South Wales. Session drummer Gregg Bissonette was originally slated to perform on the album, but after recording one song with the band his parts were dropped.

Speaking about the album during an interview about 2016 follow-up Victorious, Stockdale described the writing and recording process for New Crown as "a return to roots in some ways".

== Promotion and release ==
When the band returned in November 2013 for their first shows since reforming in July, it was officially announced that New Crown was in the works, with a release date of March or April 2014 estimated by the band's frontman Stockdale. New songs "Tall Ships" and "Heavy Weight" were debuted at later shows, before the first teaser trailer for the album was released in December featuring music from the upcoming release. An early version of the album was released on SoundCloud for a day on 13 December 2013, before the final version was released on Bandcamp without any official announcement on 23 March 2014. New Crown was released without any involvement from Wolfmother's label Universal Music Group; speaking about the decision to do this, Stockdale complained that "it’s a very long process getting anything done" with a label, noting that to avoid potential delays they took the decision to self-release the album. A remastered version of the album was re-released in January 2016 by UMG, with some songs having different mixes

== Reception ==
=== Commercial ===
Despite the lack of marketing or promotion, New Crown charted at number 160 on the US Billboard 200 chart. It also reached number nine on the Hard Rock Albums chart, number 36 on the Independent Albums chart, and number 46 on the Top Rock Albums chart. It has sold 10,000 copies in the US as of January 2016.

=== Critical ===
Professional ratings
Review scores
Source	Rating
AllMusic	3.5/5 stars
Consequence of Sound	D

Reviewing the album for music website Consequence of Sound, critic Jon Hadusek praised the songwriting on New Crown, claiming that it "houses some of [Stockdale's] best material in years". On the contrary, however, he spoke negatively about the production of the album, explaining that "The vocals are inconsistent, the guitars limp, the drums muffled. Bass comes and goes depending on the volume of the other instruments. Tracks are recorded at different volumes and mastered differently". Hadusek names his "essential track" as ""I Ain't Got No"", but criticises Stockdale for "play[ing] it too safe too often" and describes the album as "too poorly presented to be listenable". AllMusic writer Stephen Thomas Erlewine also had reservations about the album, criticising Stockdale's vocal performances which he described as "all yelps, lacking the subtle textures of Ozzy Osbourne". Erlewine, however, finished his review of New Crown by praising it as "a cracking little rock and roll record".

== Track listing ==
All tracks are written by Andrew Stockdale.

No.	Title	Length
1.	"How Many Times"	2:40
2.	"Enemy Is in Your Mind"	4:00
3.	"Heavy Weight"	3:56
4.	"New Crown"	5:36
5.	"Tall Ships"	5:12
6.	"Feelings"	2:26
7.	"I Ain't Got No"	4:07
8.	"She Got It"	2:46
9.	"My Tangerine Dream"	5:16
10.	"Radio"	5:06
Total length:		41:05

First Bandcamp release
No.	Title	Length
11.	"I Don't Know Why"	4:04
Total length:		45:09

Second Bandcamp release
No.	Title	Length
11.	"Lucky Star"	4:53
Total length:		45:58

== Personnel ==
- Andrew Stockdale – vocals, guitars, production, mixing
- Ian Peres – bass, keyboards, engineering, editing, mixing
- Vin Steele – drums
- Kevin Garcia Fernandez – engineering, editing, mixing
- Tony Solomons – photography

== Release history ==
Region	Date	Format	Label
International	23 March 2014	Digital download (Bandcamp)	Self-released
International	24 March 2014	Digital download (iTunes)	Self-released
International	24 August 2014	Compact disc	Self-released
International	24 August 2014	12" vinyl	Self-released
