= Long Way to Go (Gwen Stefani and André 3000 song) =

Song by Gwen Stefani and André 3000

from the album Love. Angel. Music. Baby.
- Released: November 23, 2004
- Recorded: 2003–2004
- Studio: Stankonia Recording (Atlanta, Georgia) Larabee Sound Studio East (Los Angeles, California) Soundcastle Studios (Los Angeles, California)
- Genre: Alternative hip hop; dance; electronic; soul
- Length: 4:34
- Label: Interscope
- Songwriters: André Benjamin; Gwen Stefani; Martin Luther King Jr.^{[a]}
- Producer: André 3000

"Long Way to Go" is a song by American singer Gwen Stefani and American rapper André 3000. The song appears as the closing track on Stefani's debut studio album, Love. Angel. Music. Baby. (2004). It was released on November 23, 2004, along with the rest of Love. Angel. Music. Baby. by Interscope Records. The track was written by both Stefani and 3000, while 3000 was the sole producer of the track. Despite being scrapped from André 3000's OutKast studio album, The Love Below (2003), Stefani and 3000 finalized a reworked version of the song to be included on the former's album. The song prominently features a sample from Martin Luther King Jr.'s 1963 "I Have a Dream" speech in its closing outro. King is credited for contributed lyrics to the song. Musically, "Long Way to Go" is influenced by electronic music and alternative hip hop, with partial influence from both dance music and soul music.

After its release, "Long Way to Go" received scrutiny for its sample of "I Have a Dream". The song also was received negatively for its outdated metaphors on interracial relationships. However, the track did receive positive attention for being a "standout" on Love. Angel. Music. Baby. and also for its electronic production, particularly the closing of the track. Stefani performed the track during her 2005 Harajuku Lovers Tour, accompanied by the Harajuku Girls. During the rendition, digital images of people were displayed on a screen before the singer, while dancers performed minimal moves to achieve a more intimate approach.

== Background and lyrics ==
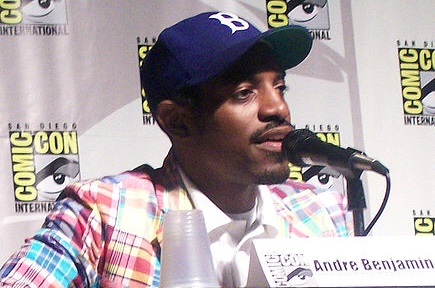
André 3000 wrote the song with Stefani for his fifth studio album The Love Below.

Production for "Long Way to Go" initially started in 2003 during recording sessions for both of Stefani and 3000's then upcoming studio albums. The original collaboration had Stefani as a featured artist, although 3000 intended for a different version of the song to make it on his album, The Love Below. The pair worked together on a slightly different version of the track, where it was then finalized and placed on Love. Angel. Music. Baby.. The original demo of the song has never been officially released to the public.

Lyrically, the song discusses prejudices against interracial dating and the beauty of love. This meaning is made clear in the lyric, "Beauty is beauty / Whether it's black or white". The line, "When snow hits the asphalt / Cold looks and bad talk come" is used as a metaphor for the backlash that may occur when dating someone of the opposite race. The song also jokes that this problematic situation is "beyond Martin Luther". Throughout the closing of the track, prominent samples of Martin Luther King Jr.'s 1963 "I Have a Dream" speech can be heard, set to "unsynchronized M.I.A. like beats" created by a CutMaster Swiff synthesizer. Vibe described MLK's speech as having "made its mark on music artists", with some artists like Stefani having "lifted his word for their own tracks".

== Critical reception ==
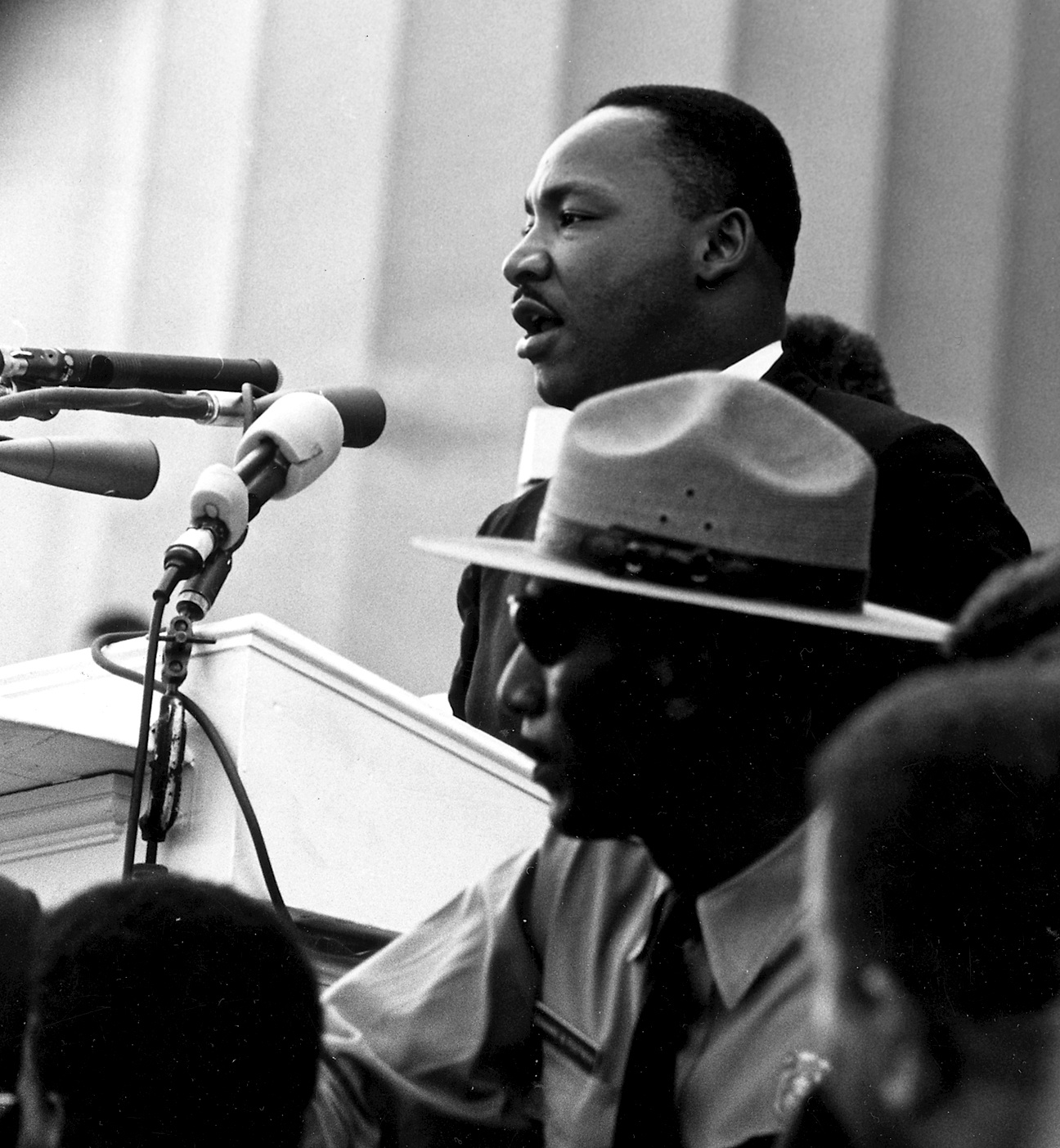
The inclusion of Martin Luther King Jr.'s 1963 "I Have a Dream" speech in "Long Way to Go" was heavily criticized.

Upon release, "Long Way to Go" received polarized reviews from critics. Some music critics heavily criticized the track for its sampling of the "I Have a Dream" speech, while others found it to be an interesting song. Jason Damas of PopMatters unfavorably compared the song to OutKast's "Spread" and claimed that Stefani "awkwardly comment[ed] on race relations and as such it's a bit of a buzzkill". Krissi Murison of the British magazine, NME, also was negative with her review, claiming that the track is a "bar the knuckle-bitingly bad duet", further adding that every song on Love. Angel. Music. Baby. sounds like a future hit, minus "Long Way to Go". Nick Sylvester of Pitchfork Media remained indifferent of the song as he thought that the song's lyrics "feel out of place on an otherwise carefree album" and preferred Stefani and 3000's other collaboration, "Bubble Pop Electric".

However, Ryan Book of Music Times, was less critical with his review: "[Stefani] took a break from colorful music videos to make a statement of racial relations... the song uses a less clear sample than the other tracks, but interpolates his words into the electronic breakdown at the end of the song". Marc Robisch of Thought Catalog felt that "Long Way to Go" is "one of the most interesting out of any on Love. Angel. Music. Baby.", further adding that the outro of the song resembles the work of M.I.A. Stephen Thomas Erlewine of AllMusic was mixed with his review, stating that the song is "a jarring buzz kill -- and that's what's appealing about L.A.M.B., even if it is such a shallow celebration of fleeting style and outdated bling-bling culture, it can grate". A review from Traxionary described "Long Way to Go" as "a plea for interracial love–or the tolerant embrace of it–the central contention that "beauty" can be "black or white/yellow or green"". In an extremely positive review of the track, Mike Usinger writing for The Georgia Straight, claimed that "[with] a surprisingly soulful duet with Andre 3000, Stefani has come up with the kind of solo album that gets singers thinking that maybe they don't need a backing band at all," referencing Stefani's time spent with No Doubt.

== Live performances ==
Stefani included the song on the setlist for her 2005 concert tour Harajuku Lovers Tour. "Long Way to Go" was performed alongside the Harajuku Girls, a Japanese dance troupe; the Girls performed minimal dance moves due to the intentional intimacy of the song. During the performance, the lyrics of "Long Way to Go" occasionally flashed on the screens above Stefani. Due to the topic of interracial dating prevalent in the song, Stefani was surrounded by individuals of different races throughout the performance.

== Track listings and formats ==
US Digital download

1. "Long Way to Go" (with André 3000) – 4:34

Interscope Records Sampler

- A1 "Rich Girl" (featuring Eve) – 3:56
- A2 "Hollaback Girl" – 3:19
- A3 "Bubble Pop Electric" (featuring Johnny Vulture) – 3:42
- B1 "Long Way to Go" (with André 3000) – 4:34
- B2 "Harajuku Girls" – 4:51
- B3 "Cool" – 3:09

== Credits and personnel ==
Management

- Recorded at Stankonia Recording, Atlanta; Larabee Sound Studio East, Los Angeles; and Soundcastle Studios, Los Angeles.

Personnel

- Gwen Stefani – lead vocals, songwriting
- André Benjamin – keyboards, lead vocals, mixing, production, songwriting
- Warren Bletcher – assistant engineering
- Greg Collins – mixing
- CutMaster Swiff – cuts
- Nick Ferrero – assistant engineering
- John Frye – additional recording
- Kevin Kendricks – keyboards, piano
- Martin Luther King Jr. – additional songwriting^{[a]}
- Kevin Mills – assistant engineering
- Pete Novak – additional recording
- Glenn Pittman – assistant engineering
- Sean Tallman – assistant engineering

Credits adapted from the liner notes of Love. Angel. Music. Baby.

== Notes ==
- ^{^a} While Martin Luther King Jr. is not credited as a songwriter of "Long Way to Go" in the album liner notes, several sources list him as one.
