= Rock Out (album) =

Studio album by Wolfmother
- Released: 12 November 2021
- Recorded: 2021
- Studio: Andrew Stockdale's home studio (Byron Bay, New South Wales); Bangalow Plaza Studios (Bangalow, New South Wales)
- Genre: Hard rock
- Length: 30:47
- Label: Self-released
- Producer: Andrew Stockdale

Wolfmother chronology
Rock'n'Roll Baby (2019)	Rock Out (2021)

Singles from Rock Out
- 1. "Rock Out" Released: 19 November 2021

Rock Out is the sixth studio album by Australian hard rock band Wolfmother. Recorded at frontman Andrew Stockdale's home studio and Bangalow Plaza Studios with engineer Cameron Lockwood, it was independently released on 12 November 2021. The album features a lineup of Stockdale on vocals, guitar and bass, Hamish Rosser on drums, and Alexx McConnell on bass for "Humble" and "Only Way". Fraser Lewry of Classic Rock magazine praised opening track "Feelin Love", writing that the song "is typical, with both a riff and a vocal that conjure up the sound of Black Sabbath at the less doomy end of the Sabbath spectrum".

== Track listing ==
All tracks are written by Andrew Stockdale.

No.	Title	Length
1.	"Feelin Love"	1:59
2.	"Rock Out"	2:07
3.	"Upload"	3:33
4.	"Humble"	3:26
5.	"Only Way"	4:54
6.	"Metal & Fire"	2:12
7.	"Outside"	2:51
8.	"Mantle"	4:09
9.	"Ego"	3:04
10.	"Walking"	2:32

== Personnel ==
- Andrew Stockdale – vocals, guitar, bass (all except tracks 4 and 5)
- Alexx McConnell – bass (tracks 4 and 5)
- Hamish Rosser – drums
- Cameron Lockwood – engineering and mixing
- Paul Pilsneniks – engineering and mixing (track 4)
