= Rock'n'Roll Baby =

Studio album by Wolfmother
- Released: 29 December 2019
- Recorded: 2017 ("Freedom Is Mine" / "Special Lady"); April–June 2019
- Studio: Studio 606
- Genre: Hard rock; heavy metal; stoner rock; neo-psychedelia
- Length: 23:00
- Label: Middle Man

Wolfmother chronology
| Victorious (2016) | Rock'n'Roll Baby (2019) | Rock Out (2021) |

Singles from Rock'n'Roll Baby
- 1. "Freedom Is Mine" Released: 14 November 2017; 2. "Higher" Released: 17 November 2019

Rock'n'Roll Baby is the fifth studio release by Australian hard rock band, Wolfmother. It was released through Middle Man on 29 December 2019.

== History ==
The album was self-released and distributed by DistroKid on 29 December 2019. Two singles were released with the album, "Freedom Is Mine" and "Higher". The album was released with no advance notice and was recorded at a studio owned by Dave Grohl, with primitive production.

== Track listing ==
All tracks are written by Andrew Stockdale.

| No. | Title | Length |
|---|---|---|
| 1. | "Higher" | 3:19 |
| 2. | "Rock'n'Roll Survivor" | 3:38 |
| 3. | "Hot Night" | 2:54 |
| 4. | "Kick Ass" | 2:45 |
| 5. | "Spanish Rose" | 3:47 |
| 6. | "Freedom Is Mine" | 3:45 |
| 7. | "Special Lady" | 3:10 |
| Total length: | | 23:00 |
