= Victorious (Wolfmother song) =

Single by Wolfmother

from the album Victorious
- Released: 20 November 2015
- Recorded: 2015
- Studio: Henson, Hollywood, California
- Genre: Hard rock
- Length: 4:24
- Label: Universal
- Songwriter: Andrew Stockdale
- Producer: Brendan O'Brien

Wolfmother singles chronology
"Far Away" (2010)	"Victorious" (2015)

Music video
- "Victorious" on YouTube

"Victorious" is a song by Australian hard rock band Wolfmother. Written by vocalist and guitarist Andrew Stockdale, it was produced by Brendan O'Brien and serves as the title track for the band's 2016 fourth studio album Victorious. The song was released as the first single from the album on 20 November 2015 and reached number 26 on the US Billboard Mainstream Rock Songs chart.

== Background ==
The worldwide debut of "Victorious" (as well as fellow Victorious track "City Lights") came on 19 November 2015, when radio DJ Zane Lowe played both songs on Apple Music station Beats 1 as part of his "World Record" feature. The song was subsequently released as a single on music streaming service Spotify, and was also included as a free digital download with every pre-order of Victorious on iTunes.

== Reception ==
Media response to "Victorious" was positive. Chad Childers of Loudwire dubbed "Victorious" a "full-on rocker", praising the "classic sounding riffs" as well as Andrew Stockdale's "instantly recognisable voice" and "upbeat and motivational lyrics". Digital Trends writer Chris Leo Palermino claimed that the song takes influence from bands such as AC/DC and Guns N' Roses, dubbing it "anthemic" and "hard-hitting".

== Music video ==
The music video for "Victorious" was released on 25 January 2016, initially exclusive to digital media website Mashable. Brother Willis directed the video, starring Aurelia Scheppers, which was filmed in Los Angeles, California. Speaking in a behind the scenes feature, both Brother Willis and Andrew Stockdale described the video as "tongue-in-cheek", and Willis described it as a "homage to sci-fi B movies", particularly from the 1970s. The spaceship-themed guitar used in the video was later given away in a competition by British music magazine Kerrang!

Speaking to Mashable, Stockdale explained that "the video is about a girl who's held hostage by evil alien folk [who] upon hearing the powers of Wolfmother's smash hit rock 'n roll extravaganza ... is set free from the dark forces of the universe". Loudwire's Chad Childers described the story of the video as "an epic battle between a sword-wielding vixen and an evil ruler".

== Charts ==
Chart (2016)	Peak position
Canada Rock (Billboard)	5
US Mainstream Rock (Billboard)	26
