= Wolfmother =

Australian hard rock band

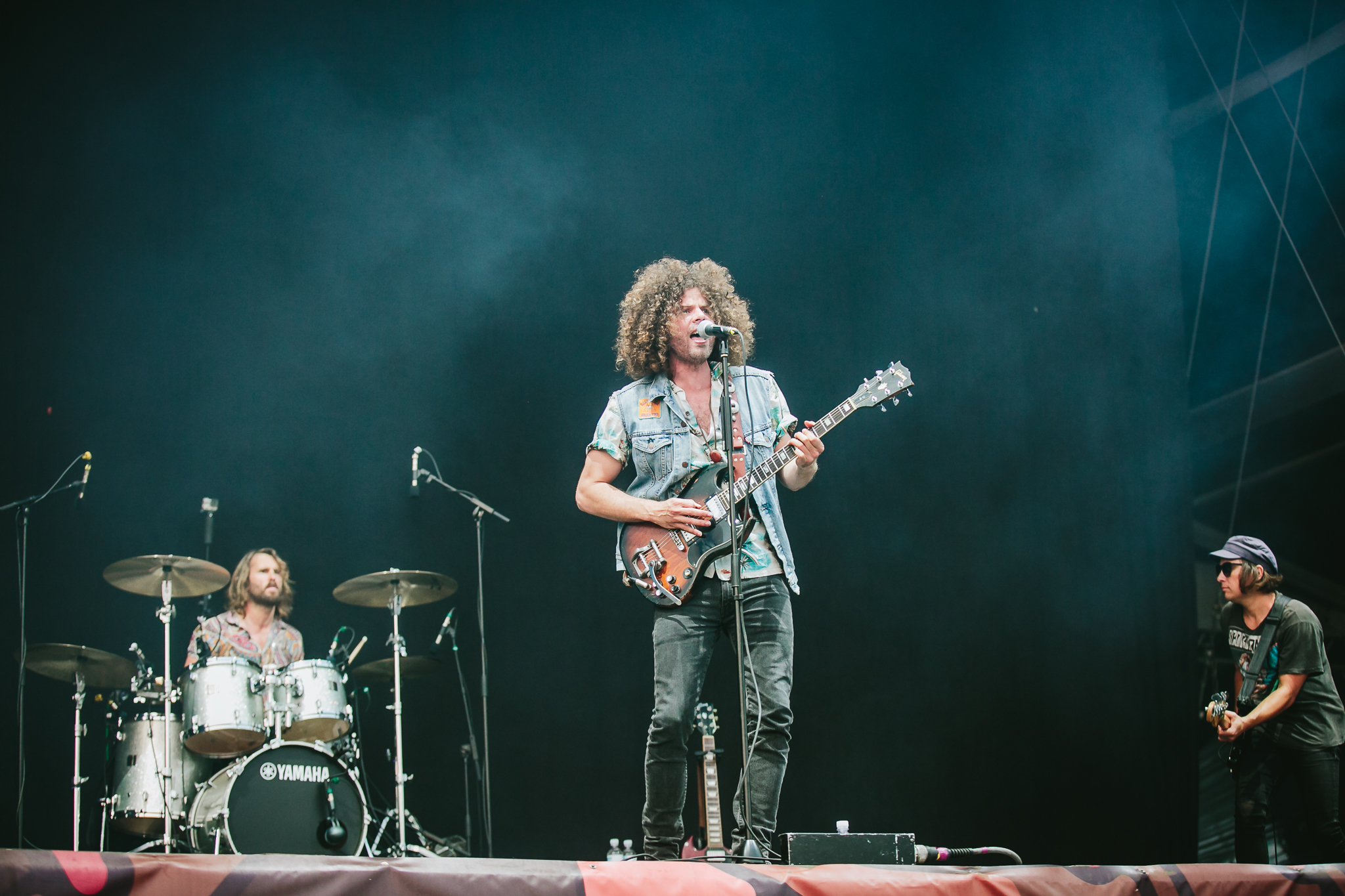
- Wolfmother performing in 2018. From left to right: Hamish Rosser, Andrew Stockdale, Brad Heald

Background information
- Also known as: White Feather (early 2009)
- Origin: Sydney, Australia
- Genres: Hard rock; blues rock; stoner rock; heavy metal; neo-psychedelia
- Years active: 2004–present
- Labels: UMe; Modular; Interscope; Island
- Members: Andrew Stockdale; James Wassenaar; Brett "Wolfie" Wolfenden
- Past members: Chris Ross; Christian Condon; Myles Heskett; Dave Atkins; Ian Peres; Aidan Nemeth; Will Rockwell-Scott; Vin Steele; Elliott Hammond; Hamish Rosser; Bobby Poulton
- Website: wolfmother.com

Wolfmother is an Australian hard rock band from Sydney. Formed in 2004, the group is centred around vocalist and guitarist Andrew Stockdale, who is the only constant member of the line-up. The band has been through many personnel changes since their formation. The original, and most commercially successful, line-up included bassist and keyboardist Chris Ross and drummer Myles Heskett. Ross and Heskett left Wolfmother after four years in 2008.

Stockdale, Ross and Heskett formed Wolfmother in 2004 after several years of informal jamming. Signing with independent label Modular Recordings, the band released their self-titled debut album in Australia in 2005, which reached number 3 on the domestic albums chart. It was released internationally by Interscope and Island Records the following year, and to date has sold in excess of 1.6 million copies worldwide. After Ross and Heskett departed, Stockdale rebuilt the band with the addition of bassist and keyboardist Ian Peres, rhythm guitarist Aidan Nemeth and drummer Dave Atkins, who released Cosmic Egg in 2009.

In recent years, the line-up of Wolfmother has continued to change frequently, with their commercial popularity fluctuating. The band's planned third album Keep Moving was released as Stockdale's solo debut in 2013, with a new line-up including drummer Vin Steele issuing New Crown independently the following year. In 2016, the group released Victorious as their first album on a major label since Cosmic Egg, and subsequently toured with Alex Carapetis on drums. Wolfmother's personnel have continued to change, with Stockdale subsequently releasing and touring in promotion of his second solo album Slipstream in 2018.

== History ==
=== 2004–08: Formation, early years and self-titled debut ===
The genesis of Wolfmother began in 2000, when founding members Andrew Stockdale, Chris Ross, and Myles Heskett started jamming together, before officially forming the band in 2004. Prior to this, Stockdale was a photographer, Ross worked in digital media and Heskett worked as a graphic designer. Ross came up with the name of the band based on the Tom Robbins novel Skinny Legs and All. The first live performance of the newly christened Wolfmother took place on 14 April 2004 at Vic in the Park, a pub in Sydney. The group were signed by Australian independent label Modular Recordings in August 2004, with whom they released their self-titled debut extended play (EP) Wolfmother the following month. The EP reached number 35 on the ARIA Australian Singles Chart. The band toured in promotion of the release for approximately six months, during which time they signed an international recording deal with the Universal Music Group.

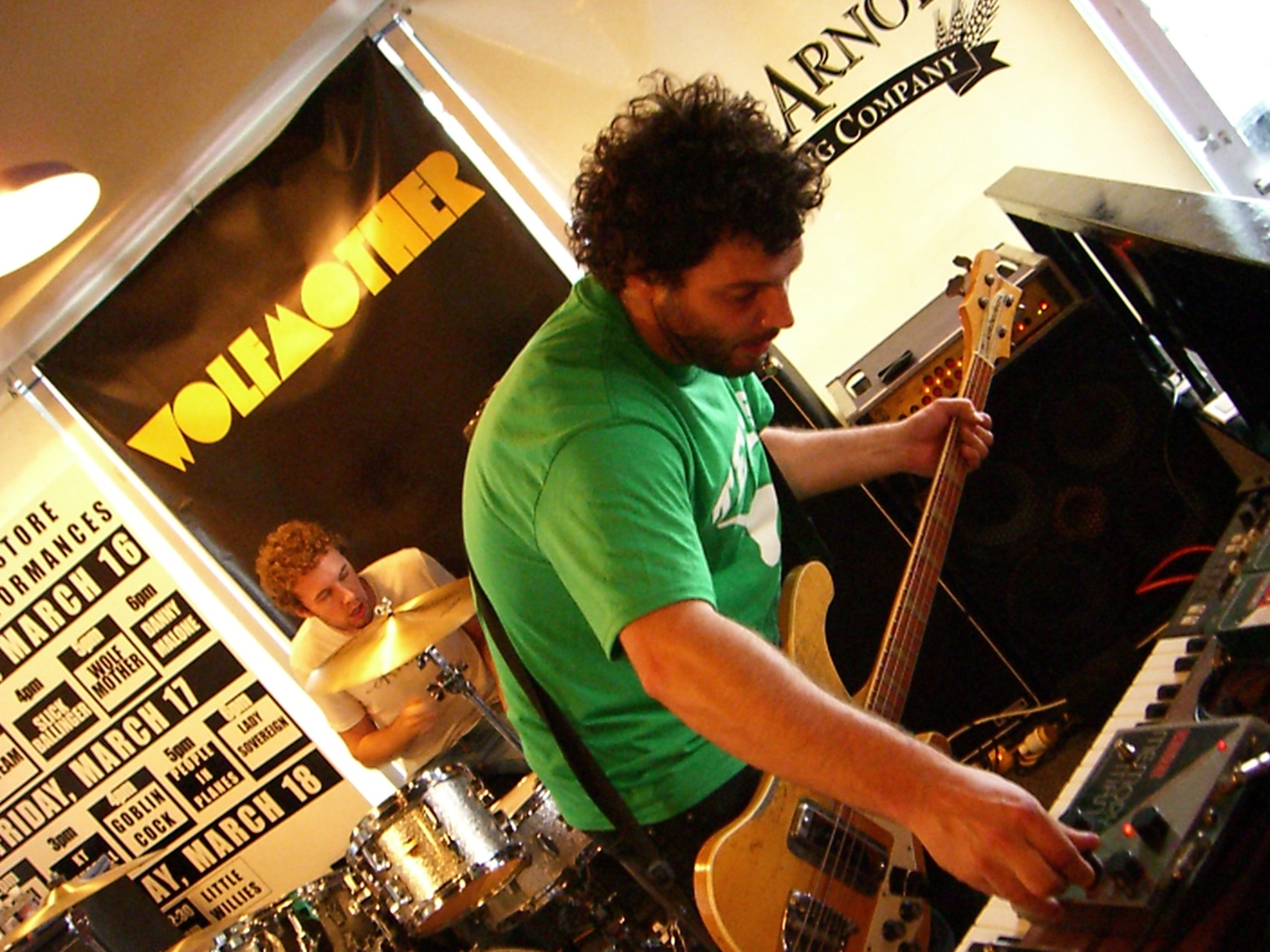
Drummer Myles Heskett (left) and bassist and keyboardist Chris Ross were members of Wolfmother from 2004 to 2008.

After producing a demo for Universal US imprint Interscope Records in Sydney, Wolfmother began recording their full-length debut studio album in California with producer Dave Sardy in May 2005. The band rehearsed for six weeks at Cherokee Studios, before recording at Sound City, Pass and Sunset Sound Studios. Sardy took a minimalist approach to production, aiming to capture the "raw, emotive" nature of the band's live shows and prioritising "the perfect feeling" over a "faultless performance". Additional contributors to the record included Lenny Castro (percussion), Dan Higgins (flute) and Sardy himself (percussion). "Mind's Eye" was released as the first single from the upcoming album on 16 October 2005, which reached number 29 on the Australian Singles Chart.

Wolfmother was originally released in Australia by Modular on 31 October 2005 and reached number 3 on the ARIA Australian Albums Chart, remaining on the chart for a total of 78 weeks. By the end of 2007, it had been certified five times platinum by the Australian Recording Industry Association (ARIA), indicating domestic sales in excess of 350,000 units. Wolfmother was recognised by radio station Triple J with its inaugural J Award, given to "an album of outstanding achievement as an Australian musical work of art – for its creativity, innovation, musicianship and contribution to Australian music." It went on to be nominated for the ARIA Award for Album of the Year in 2006 (and won the awards for Breakthrough Artist – Album and Best Rock Album). Eight of the group's songs were included on the Triple J Hottest 100 lists in 2004, 2005 and 2006. In promotion of the album, the band toured throughout Australia in October and November 2005. They also performed at the Big Day Out festival in January and February 2006.

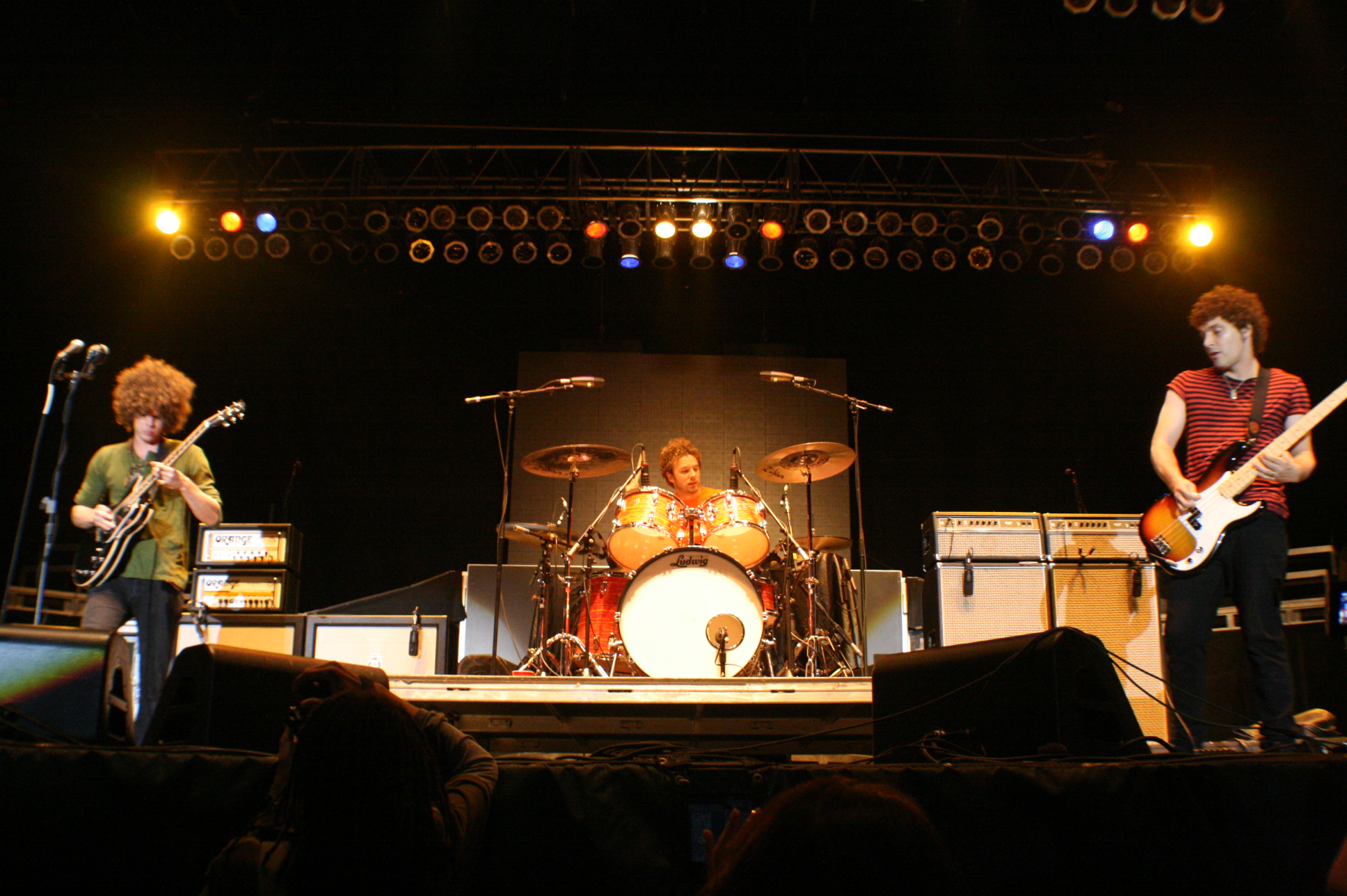
Wolfmother performing in May 2007

After its success in Australia, Wolfmother was later released internationally in early 2006 – on 24 April in the UK, where it reached number 25 on the UK Albums Chart, and on 2 May in the US, where it reached number 22 on the Billboard 200. A number of singles were released from the album, including "Woman" which reached number 34 in Australia, number 31 on the UK Singles Chart, and number 7 on the US Billboard Mainstream Rock chart. The song later won the Grammy Award for Best Hard Rock Performance at the 49th Annual Grammy Awards, the nomination for which Heskett had previously described as "an honour". The final single from the album, "Joker & the Thief", later reached the top ten in Australia. The subsequent worldwide tour included appearances at festivals such as Fuji Rock in Tokyo, Japan, the inaugural Virgin Festival, and Reading and Leeds Festivals in the UK. On 14 November 2006, the band performed a cover version of "Communication Breakdown" by English hard rock band Led Zeppelin as a tribute to the band for their induction into the UK Music Hall of Fame.

Stockdale, Ross and Heskett commenced work on the follow-up to Wolfmother in 2007, although Stockdale had previously revealed that he had been planning ideas for the band's second album as early as 2006. One of the new tracks revealed as in the works was "Love Attacker", which the frontman explained was about "people who use love as a weapon to manipulate and get their way through desire". This song was later released as "Pleased to Meet You" on the Spider-Man 3 soundtrack in March 2007. Stockdale described the new material as "cinematic" and "epic", predicting that the resulting album would be released in early 2008. In September 2007 the band released Please Experience Wolfmother Live, which reached number 7 in Australia and was certified platinum by ARIA.

=== 2008–11: Lineup change and return with Cosmic Egg ===
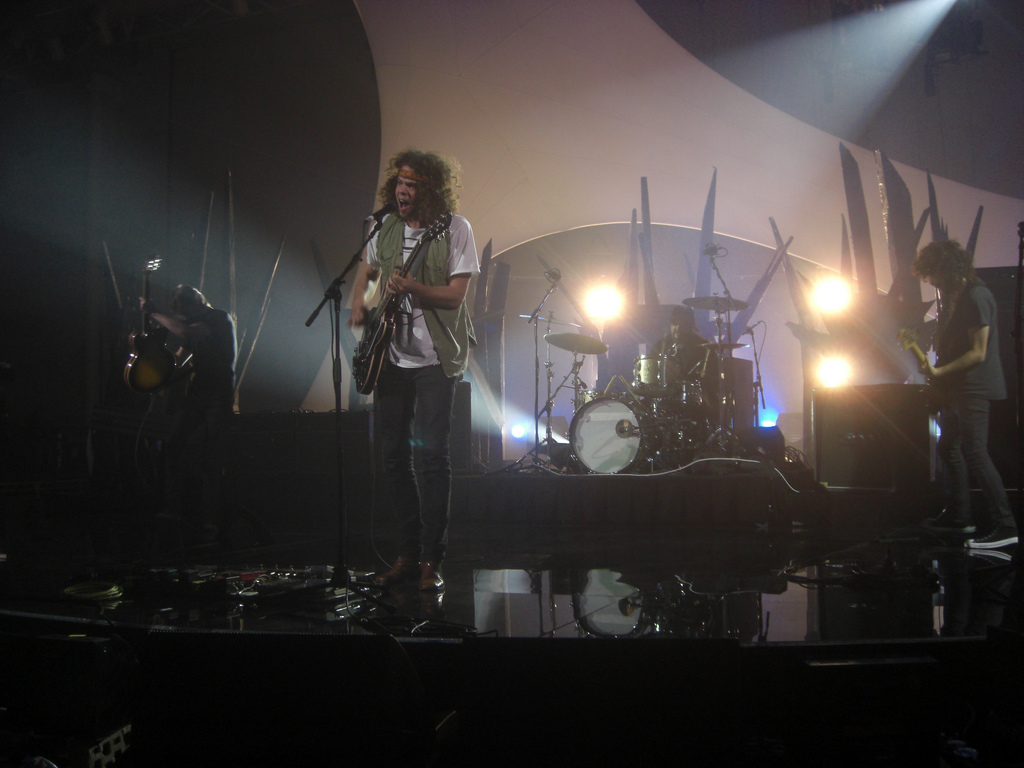
Wolfmother returned in 2009 after a brief hiatus with a line-up including Ian Peres, Aidan Nemeth and Dave Atkins.

After their performance at Splendour in the Grass on 3 August 2008, it was reported that Wolfmother "looked tense and uncommunicative with each other", leading to rumours that the band were to imminently break up. In response to the rumours, the band's manager John Watson revealed that he would be "releasing a statement about their status soon". Days later, it was confirmed that the group had split up – in a statement released by Universal Music Australia, it was reported that Ross had left the band straight after the Splendour in the Grass performance due to "irreconcilable personal and musical differences", after which Heskett decided that he would rather leave than remain in the band without Ross. Ross and Heskett continued to work together on a number of musical projects, including The Slew and Good Heavens.

Just a week after the departure of Ross and Heskett, Stockdale returned to recording the second Wolfmother album in Los Angeles, initially working briefly with The Raconteurs drummer Patrick Keeler. After returning to Australia, he enlisted new members Ian Peres (bass, keyboards), Aidan Nemeth (rhythm guitar) and Dave Atkins (drums) for "Wolfmother Phase II". The new members officially joined on 5 January 2009, before performing their first live shows under the alias "White Feather" in February. Recording for a new album commenced in March with producer Alan Moulder, with Stockdale describing the material as "a little bit heavier".

The first song released by the second line-up of Wolfmother was "Back Round", which was made available as a free digital download on the band's official website on 30 March 2009, after its debut live performance the previous week at the MTV Australia Awards 2009. After the rest of the album was recorded, "New Moon Rising" debuted on Triple J in August and was later released as the album's lead single. The album, Cosmic Egg, was released internationally by Modular in October. It was another commercial success, reaching number 3 in Australia, number 16 in the US, and number 35 in the UK. Cosmic Egg was supported on the New Moon Rising World Tour, which started in Australia and later visited North America and Europe. The group also supported AC/DC on the Black Ice World Tour in Australia. The following year, the album was nominated in the Classic Rock Roll of Honour Awards for Album of the Year, although it lost out to guitarist Slash's self-titled debut solo album (on which Stockdale is featured on the song "By the Sword").

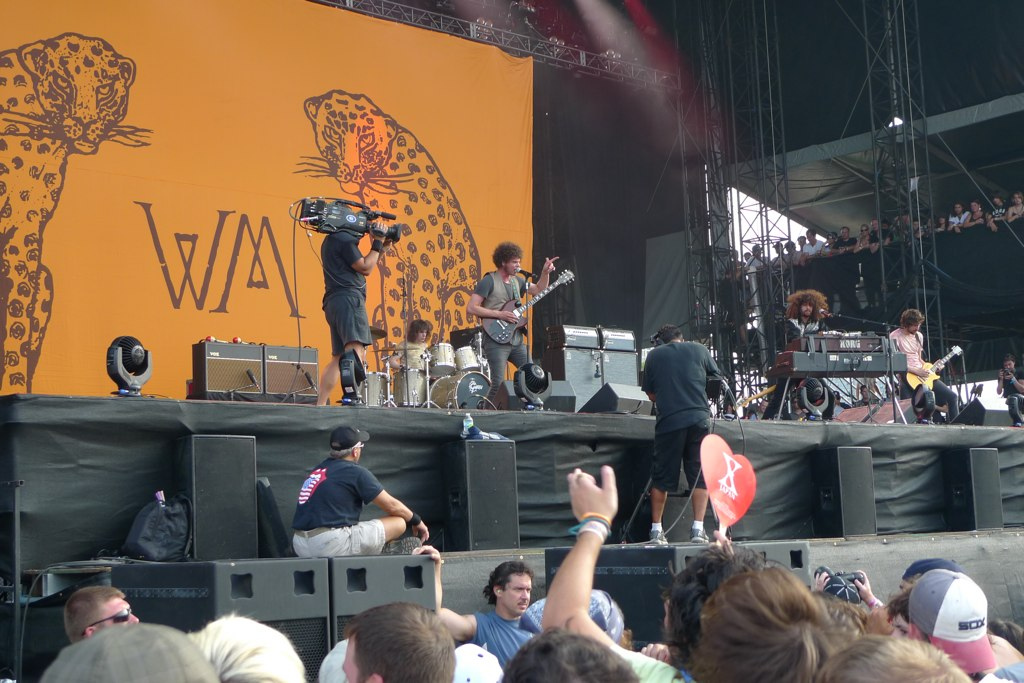
In 2010, Will Rockwell-Scott replaced Dave Atkins. This line-up began work on Wolfmother's third album in 2011.

In March 2010, Wolfmother contributed the song "Fell Down a Hole" to the Almost Alice soundtrack. At the end of the month, it was announced that drummer Dave Atkins had left the band. A press release was later issued explaining that the drummer had "decided to leave the band to spend much-needed time at home with his family". It was announced at the same time that Atkins' replacement would be Will Rockwell-Scott, known for his work with Har Mar Superstar and The Mooney Suzuki. The group continued to tour with Rockwell-Scott, although they had to cancel a string of European dates, including a number of festival appearances, in June and July due to an unspecified illness suffered by Stockdale. The following January and February, the band performed at Big Day Out in Australia and New Zealand.

=== 2011–13: Planned third album, Stockdale's solo debut ===
Wolfmother began working on their third studio album in March 2011. In May and June they played a number of European shows, performing new material from the upcoming album for the first time. Interviewed in June, Stockdale revealed that approximately "12 or 13 songs" had been completed and that he was self-producing the album, with engineering to be handled by Aidan Nemeth. The release date of the album was estimated as early 2012, with a number of shows taking place in Australia in promotion; new song titles leaked from set lists included "The Year of the Dragon", "Meridian" and "Everyday Drone/On the Beach". In October 2011, a cover version of the ZZ Top song "Cheap Sunglasses" was featured on the various artists tribute album ZZ Top: A Tribute from Friends.

After relatively few updates regarding the upcoming album, in February 2012 both Nemeth and Rockwell-Scott left Wolfmother. Stockdale claimed at the time that the former had chosen to focus on engineering, while the latter was forced to leave due to health concerns. The following month, it was reported that former Vines drummer Hamish Rosser had joined the band. Around the same time, new rhythm guitarist Vin Steele replaced Nemeth, and keyboardist and percussionist Elliott Hammond was also added to the group. Both members' departures were compared in the media to those of original members Ross and Heskett, although Stockdale has denied accusations from some critics that he was to blame for former members leaving the group. The new five-piece line-up continued recording material for the new album, which was delayed further for a 2013 release. At the end of 2012, Stockdale announced that the album was "nearly complete", and that it would be titled Gatherings.

In March 2013, however, Stockdale announced that he would not be releasing the new album under the Wolfmother moniker. Describing the project as "a different trip now", he revealed to Billboard magazine in April that the album would be released as his solo debut with the title Keep Moving in June. "Long Way to Go" was released as the lead single from the album. Stockdale later elaborated on the decision to cease using the Wolfmother name; he noted that his desire to self-produce an album played a part in the change, adding the band had a "big producer" in line to work on their third album but he wanted to release the material he had already recorded, and so he decided to do so under his own name. Keep Moving reached number 32 on the Australian Albums Chart.

=== 2013–17: Band's return with New Crown and Victorious ===
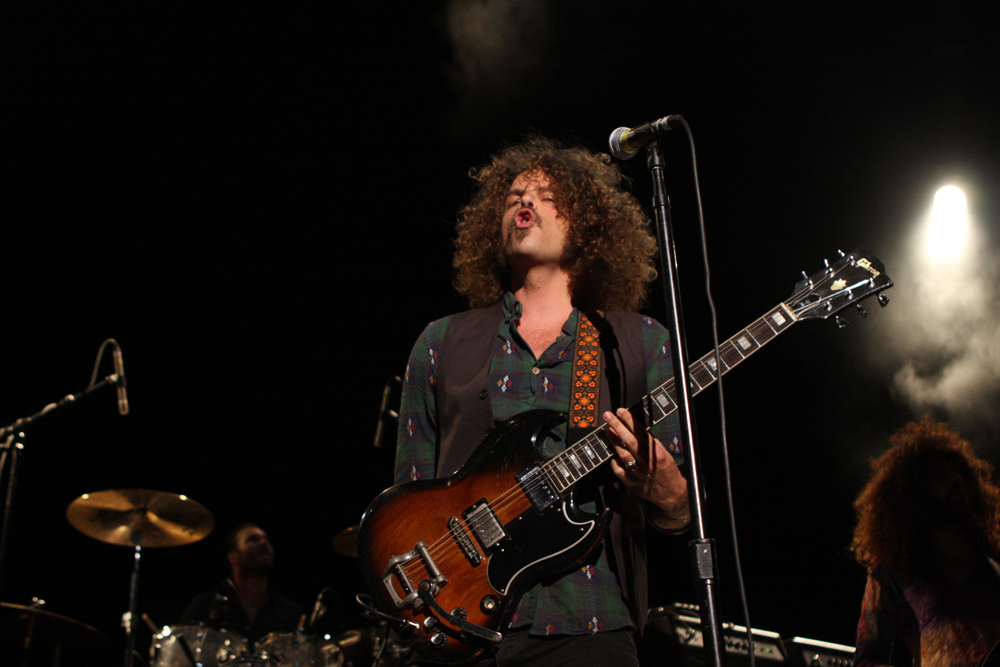
Andrew Stockdale briefly dropped the Wolfmother moniker in 2013, before returning to using it later in the year.

Just two months after Stockdale dropped the band's name, it was announced that Wolfmother were due to return. The news was broken when Stockdale's solo shows were cancelled, shortly before a number of Wolfmother shows in the US were announced in their place. In an interview with Triple M in 2014, Stockdale claimed that he did not intend to drop the Wolfmother name permanently, but instead that it had been temporarily "shelved" for Keep Moving. Shortly after the band's return, Rosser left and Hammond moved over to drums; however, just a month later Hammond himself left as well, citing scheduling conflicts with his other band The Delta Riggs. Hammond later claimed in 2019 that the announcement was in fact "a publicity angle to smooth it over". He was replaced briefly by Tony McCall, who left just a few weeks later due to "personal reasons". Drummer Gregg Bissonette was briefly enlisted to record with the band, although his parts were ultimately not used.

In November 2013, Wolfmother returned after a brief hiatus as a trio for the first time since 2008, with rhythm guitarist Vin Steele moving over to drums. The new line-up's first performance took place at The Northern in Byron Bay, and it was hinted at the same time that the group would be working on new material for an album to be released in March or April 2014. The album in question, New Crown, was released without a prior announcement on 24 March 2014 as a digital download on Bandcamp. Self-produced by Stockdale, New Crown was also self-released by the band without a record label; speaking about the decision to do this, Stockdale complained that "it's a very long process getting anything done" with a label, noting that to avoid potential delays they took the decision to self-release the album. Despite the lack of promotion, New Crown charted on the US Billboard 200 at number 160. The album was promoted on tour in North America during the months after its release.

Wolfmother's self-titled debut album was re-released in September 2015 to coincide with its tenth anniversary. In addition to the original 13 tracks, the album contains five B-sides and 15 rare tracks, including 11 previously unreleased recordings. In February 2016, the group's fourth album Victorious was released. The album, produced by Brendan O'Brien, features contributions from drummers Josh Freese and Joey Waronker, in addition to Ian Peres on keyboards. It reached number 17 on the Australian Albums Chart, number 25 in the UK, and number 71 in the US. Lead single "Victorious" registered at number 26 on the Billboard Mainstream Rock chart. Wolfmother promoted Victorious on the Gypsy Caravan Tour, which featured Alex Carapetis on drums. In July 2016, the group supported Guns N' Roses at two US dates on the Not in This Lifetime... Tour. They later returned for shows in Australia and New Zealand in early 2017.

=== 2017–present: Single releases, Slipstream, Rock'n'Roll Baby and Rock Out ===
Following the conclusion of the Victorious touring cycle, Hamish Rosser returned to Wolfmother. In March 2017, Stockdale released a self-produced song called "Special Lady", which he recorded on a laptop using the program GarageBand and only a vocal microphone. This was followed in November by the single "Freedom Is Mine", recorded and produced at Stockdale's home studio in Byron Bay, and "Happy Wolfmothers Day" in May 2018. Peres left in early 2018 after nine years with the band, committing to tour dates with Xavier Rudd instead. Stockdale and Rosser have performed with multiple touring line-ups of the group since Peres' departure: in April 2018 with Dave Atkins on rhythm guitar and Jake Bennett on bass, from May with Brad Heald on bass and Lachy Doley on keyboards, and later in the year with Katie McGurl in place of Doley. Bobby Poulton began playing bass and keyboards in October 2018 and is now the current session player in the band. In September 2018, Stockdale released his second solo album, Slipstream, which he promoted on a short concert tour.

In April 2019, Stockdale began recording material for a fifth Wolfmother album at Dave Grohl's Studio 606 in Northridge, Los Angeles. This album, titled Rock'n'Roll Baby, wound up being released on 29 December 2019. On 24 October 2020, Stockdale performed "Joker & the Thief" at the 2020 AFL Grand Final. The band's next self-produced album, Rock Out, was released in November of 2021.

On 11 January 2023, Stockdale performed under the name Wolfmother with Dutch band Paceshifters as his backing band in Paradiso, Amsterdam.

== Musical style and critical reception ==
Upon the release of their debut album, Wolfmother received comparisons to influential hard rock and heavy metal bands of the 1960s and 1970s, particularly Led Zeppelin, Black Sabbath, and Blue Cheer. More contemporary comparisons have included Roadkit and White, The White Stripes, The Darkness, and Queens of the Stone Age. Similarly, the vocals of frontman Andrew Stockdale have been compared stylistically to those of Led Zeppelin frontman Robert Plant, Black Sabbath's Ozzy Osbourne, The Who vocalist Roger Daltrey, and Jack White of The White Stripes. AskMen went as far as to rank the band as the second top Led Zeppelin "rip-off" band. Many of these comparisons to other bands continued in reviews for Cosmic Egg, New Crown, and Victorious.

Despite these comparisons to other artists, Wolfmother was praised by the majority of commentators – aggregating website Metacritic reports a normalised rating of 76, indicating "generally favourable reviews", with 18 of the 22 included critical reviews categorised as positive. Many elements of the band's music on their debut album were praised by critics, including the psychedelic subject matter of the lyrics, the interplay between each member of the band, and the combination of classic and modern elements. Critical reception to Cosmic Egg was less positive, with Metacritic reporting a normalised rating of 65 and many critics noting a lack of invention or progression on the album.

In 2025, Jeff Mezydlo of Yardbarker included the band in his list of "the greatest metal acts that formed in the 2000s".

== Members ==
Current members

- Andrew Stockdale – lead vocals, guitar (2004–present)
- James Wassenaar – bass (2023–present)
- Brett "Wolfie" Wolfenden – drums (2024–present)

== Discography ==
- Wolfmother (2005)
- Cosmic Egg (2009)
- New Crown (2014)
- Victorious (2016)
- Rock'n'Roll Baby (2019)
- Rock Out (2021)
