= Long Way to Go (Andrew Stockdale song) =

Single by Andrew Stockdale

from the album Keep Moving
- Released: 19 March 2013
- Recorded: 2012–13 at Rockinghorse Studio (Byron Bay, New South Wales)
- Genre: Hard rock
- Length: 4:52
- Songwriter(s): Andrew Stockdale
- Producer(s): Andrew Stockdale

Music video
- "Long Way to Go" on YouTube

"Long Way to Go" is a song by Australian hard rock musician Andrew Stockdale, due to be featured on his 2013 debut album Keep Moving. Written and self-produced by the former Wolfmother frontman, the song was recorded with bandmates Ian Peres, Vin Steele, Elliott Hammond and Hamish Rosser, and was released as the lead single from the album in March 2013.

== Background ==
"Long Way to Go" is written by Andrew Stockdale, and was conceived around the time of the final lineup change in Wolfmother in February 2012, when rhythm guitarist Aidan Nemeth and drummer Will Rockwell-Scott were replaced by Vin Steele and Hamish Rosser, respectively, becoming one of the first new songs to be performed by the final incarnation until Stockdale's later transition into a solo artist.

== Recording ==
The opening track on Keep Moving, "Long Way to Go" features the final lineup of Andrew Stockdale's former band Wolfmother, with Ian Peres (bass, organ, Wurlitzer electric piano), Vin Steele (rhythm guitar), Elliott Hammond (Wurlitzer electric piano, bongos) and Hamish Rosser (drums) joining the eponymous vocalist and guitarist on the track. The song was recorded at the Rockinghorse Studio with engineer Nicolas Wilson and mixed and edited by former Wolfmother drummer Dave Atkins with Peres, before a final mix was produced at Sputnik Sound in Nashville, Tennessee by Vance Powell.

== Release and reception ==
The music video for "Long Way to Go" – Stockdale's first under his solo moniker – was officially released on YouTube on 3 April 2013, after an unfinished version was published on Vimeo a few weeks before. The song is the opening track on the album Keep Moving, which was released in June 2013.

== Personnel ==
Musical personnel

- Andrew Stockdale – vocals, lead guitar, production
- Ian Peres – bass, organ, Wurlitzer electric piano, Pro Tools editing
- Vin Steele – rhythm guitar
- Elliott Hammond – Wurlitzer electric piano, bongos
- Hamish Rosser – drums

Additional personnel

- Nicolas Wilson – engineering
- Dave Atkins – editing, mixing (rough)
- Vance Powell – mixing (final)
- Chris Athens – mastering

== Release history ==
Region	Date	Format	Label
Australia	March 19, 2013	Digital download	Universal Records
Belgium	March 19, 2013	Digital download	Universal Records
Canada	March 19, 2013	Digital download	Universal Records
France	March 19, 2013	Digital download	Universal Records
Germany	March 19, 2013	Digital download	Universal Records
Ireland	March 19, 2013	Digital download	Universal Records
Italy	March 19, 2013	Digital download	Universal Records
Netherlands	March 19, 2013	Digital download	Universal Records
New Zealand	March 19, 2013	Digital download	Universal Records
United Kingdom	March 19, 2013	Digital download	Universal Records
United States	March 19, 2013	Digital download	Universal Records
