= Victorious (Wolfmother album) =

Studio album by Wolfmother
- Released: 19 February 2016
- Recorded: 2015
- Studio: Henson Recording Studios (Hollywood)
- Genres: Hard rock; heavy metal; stoner rock; neo-psychedelia
- Length: 35:20
- Label: UMe
- Producer: Brendan O'Brien

Wolfmother chronology
New Crown (2014)	Victorious (2016)	Rock'n'Roll Baby (2019)

Singles from Victorious
- 1. "Victorious" Released: 20 November 2015

Victorious is the fourth studio album by Australian hard rock band Wolfmother. Recorded at Henson Recording Studios in Hollywood, California with producer Brendan O'Brien, it was released on 19 February 2016 by Universal Music Enterprises. The album was preceded by the release of the title track "Victorious" as a single, which reached number 26 on the US Billboard Mainstream Rock chart.

Wolfmother frontman Andrew Stockdale began work on Victorious after promoting the band's third album New Crown throughout 2014. He wrote all songs on the album and performed all vocals, guitars and bass, with regular bassist Ian Peres contributing keyboards only. Drums were recorded by guest contributors Josh Freese and Joey Waronker, while O'Brien performed additional instrumental parts.

Victorious received mixed to positive reviews from critics. Many commentators hailed the album as a "return to form" for the band following numerous lineup changes and the low-key independent release of New Crown, although others criticised it as merely derivative of the band's influences. The album was commercially successful, reaching the top 40 in several territories including Australia and the UK.

== Recording and production ==
Wolfmother frontman Andrew Stockdale began working on the follow-up to 2014's New Crown in January 2015 at a studio in New South Wales, writing songs on guitar, bass and drums as he had done previously with the band's 2005 self-titled album. Speaking about the writing process, Stockdale explained that "Back in the early days, I'd play guitar, bass, and drums and then present the ideas to the band and we'd work on the arrangement together", which he claimed is "a good way to do things because it can make the style more cohesive." Two of the earliest tracks written for the album were "The Love That You Give" and "Pretty Peggy", the latter of which was completed in approximately an hour.

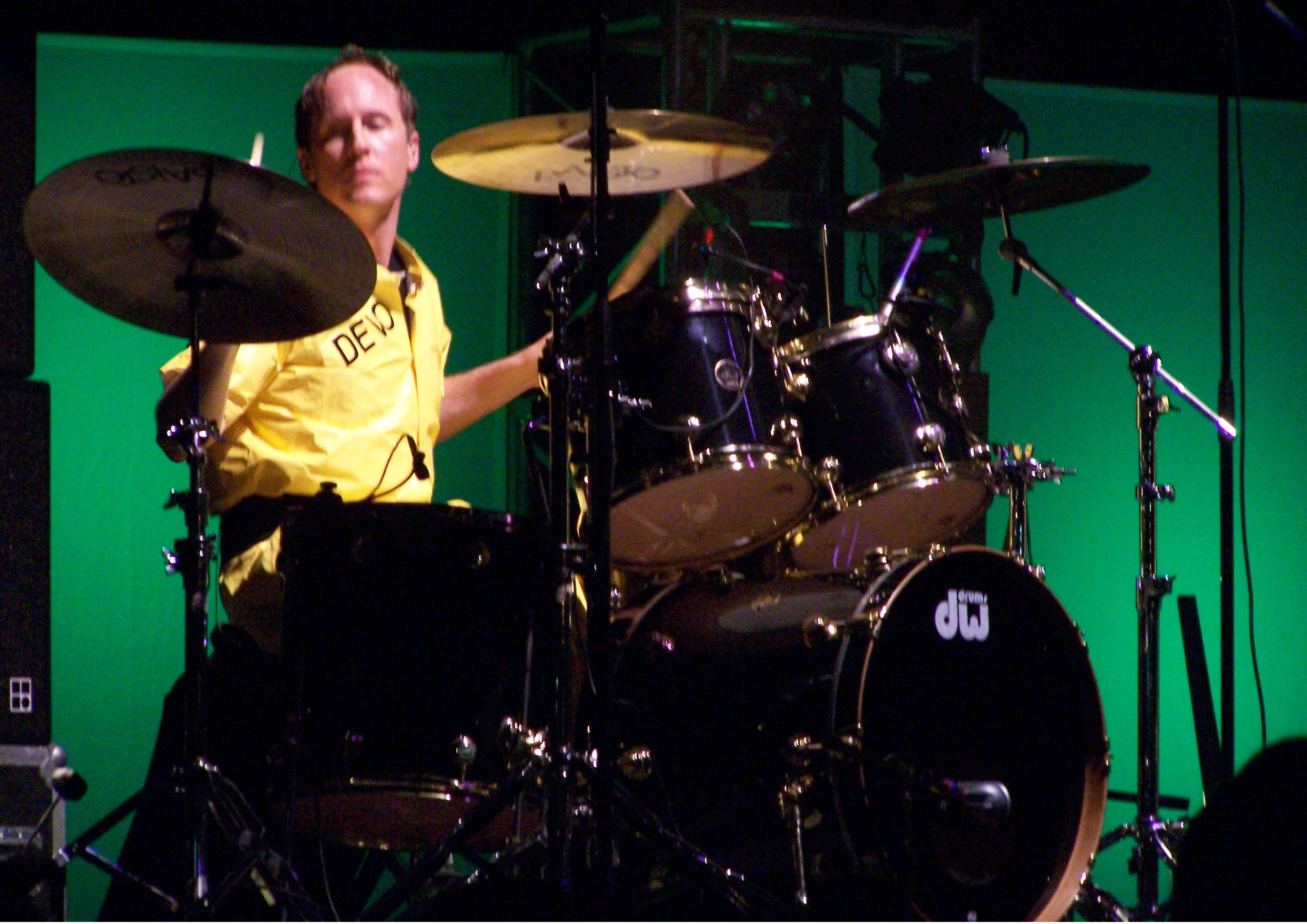
Josh Freese performed drums on all but three of the album's tracks.

Recording for Victorious took place at Henson Recording Studios in Hollywood, California, with production led by Brendan O'Brien. Stockdale was crediting for writing all of the material and performing all vocals, guitars and bass, with drum contributions coming from Josh Freese and Joey Waronker. Ian Peres did not perform bass on the album as usual, but did record all keyboard parts. Speaking about the recording process, Stockdale has claimed that the sessions were very quick and simple, with a song completed every day or two between himself, O'Brien and the drummer. The album was reportedly finished within a month and a half.

== Promotion and release ==
The first two songs premiered from Victorious were "Victorious" and "City Lights", which were played on Apple Music's Beats 1 radio station by Zane Lowe on 19 November 2015. "Victorious" was later released as the lead single from the album and reached number 27 on the US Billboard Mainstream Rock chart. "Gypsy Caravan" was released online on 5 January 2016, followed by a lyric video for "Pretty Peggy" on 9 February. All four songs were later included for free with every pre-order of Victorious on iTunes. The album was made available for streaming in full on the National Public Radio website from 10 February 2016. "Victorious", alongside "Love Train" and "New Moon Rising", was released as a playable track on Guitar Hero Live in February 2016.

Following the album's release, Wolfmother embarked on the Gypsy Caravan Tour, which started with a North American leg on 24 February 2016 in Minneapolis, Minnesota running until 1 April in Vancouver, British Columbia. This is due to be followed by a 27-show European leg running from 8 April to 14 May. Speaking at the time of the album's announcement, Stockdale noted that the touring lineup would include Ian Peres, but that the drummer would be dependent on schedules; he identified Cosmic Egg drummer Dave Atkins as a possibility. It was later revealed that Alex Carapetis, who played with the band at a number of shows in 2015, would be returning to the group to play drums on the tour.

== Composition ==
=== Music ===
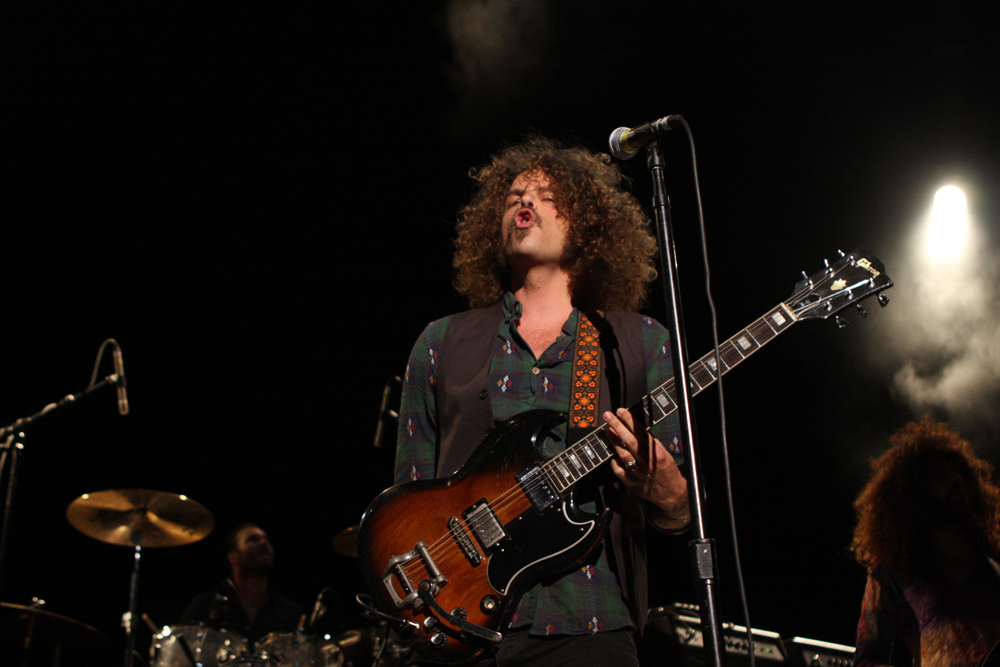
Frontman Andrew Stockdale wrote all of the songs on Victorious.

Like those on Wolfmother's previous releases, the songs on Victorious have been compared stylistically to the music of various influential hard rock and heavy metal bands of the 1970s and 1980s. Writing for The Boston Globe, Marc Hirsh proclaimed that on the album "Wolfmother once again lives in thrall of Black Sabbath and the heavy hard-rock boogie of '70s bands like Foghat", also naming Boston as a reference point for the style of "Best of a Bad Situation". Similarly, PopMatters writer Jedd Beaudoin identified Black Sabbath's influence on opening track "The Love That You Give", as well as noting stylistic similarities to Sweet, Queen and T. Rex on "Baroness". Loudwire's Chad Childers compared "Victorious" to Black Sabbath, while National Public Radio's Jason Heller added Led Zeppelin, MC5, Deep Purple and The White Stripes to the list of similar bands.

=== Lyrics ===
The title track "Victorious" was written about "small victories we have ... More so than a battle", which Stockdale claimed "can be a bit one dimensional". The chorus lyric "She will be victorious" was initially going to be "We will be victorious" instead, but Stockdale changed it because he didn't want it to sound "enemy-driven". "Pretty Peggy" is described as a "love song" by Mikey Cahill of News.com.au and Beaudoin of PopMatters, while Heller highlighted its "slickly harmonised, larger-than-life, woah-woah-woah chorus". The National Public Radio writer also included "Baroness" in the category of love songs, describing the track's lyrics as "saucy come-ons".

In a track-by-track commentary of the album on Spotify, Stockdale explained that "City Lights" is lyrically "about living in a small beach town in Australia" and visiting larger locations like Sydney or metropolitan areas abroad to "have that city fix, get out of the bubble ... and have that kind of anonymity and variety". "Gypsy Caravan" was co-written by Spiderbait drummer and vocalist Kram during an impromptu session with Stockdale in Byron Bay, and was originally known by the title "Behemoth". Kram initially sang the verses of the song, which Stockdale later rewrote during the sessions with Brendan O'Brien. Bonus track "Wedding" was co-written by Kadavar drummer Christoph "Tiger" Bartelt.

== Reception ==
=== Commercial ===
Victorious entered the Australian Albums Chart at number 17 on 27 February 2016, 14 places lower than both Wolfmother and Cosmic Egg. In the UK it reached number 25 on the UK Albums Chart (the same position as Wolfmother), as well as topping the UK Rock & Metal Albums Chart. In the United States, the album debuted at number 71 on the Billboard 200, as well reaching number two on the Hard Rock Albums chart, number eight on the Tastemaker Albums chart, number nine on the Alternative Albums chart, and number 11 on the Top Rock Albums chart. The album also reached number nine in Germany, number 20 in the Netherlands, number 34 in Finland, number 35 in the Flanders region of Belgium, number 49 in the Wallonia region of Belgium, and number 92 in Italy.

=== Critical ===
Professional ratings
Aggregate scores
Source	Rating
Metacritic	61/100
Review scores
Source	Rating
AllMusic	2.5/5 stars
The Boston Globe	Unfavourable
Classic Rock	3.5/5
Consequence of Sound	D+
DIY	2/5 stars
Kerrang!	4/5 stars
The Observer	3/5 stars
PopMatters	7/10 stars
Record Collector	3/5 stars
Uncut	7/10

Media response to Victorious was mixed to positive; aggregating website Metacritic reports a normalised rating of 61 based on 11 critical reviews, indicating "generally favourable reviews". Music magazine Kerrang! awarded the album four out of five stars, claiming that it is "easily good enough to keep Wolfmother in orbit". Jedd Beaudoin of PopMatters described the album as a "welcome and appropriate return from one of the best bands to emerge in the last decade", praising in equal measures Stockdale's songwriting and O'Brien's production. The Observer writer Phil Mongredien had mixed views about the album, describing it as "flawed, but enjoyable".

Writing for National Public Radio, Jason Heller claimed that all ten songs on Victorious "screech for the stars", praising tracks such as "Baroness", "City Lights" and "Gypsy Caravan" in particular. Loudwire's Chad Childers claimed that the album features "the vitality, energy and muscle that put the band on the musical map back in the mid-2000s", highlighting "Victorious", "Pretty Peggy" and "City Lights" as "standout" tracks. A review by The Queensland Times praised the album for being "true to the traditions of the Aussie rock world with heavy sounds built in a beach-side studio".

On the other hand, Consequence of Sound writer Jeremy Zerbe criticised the album as one of the worst released by the band, claiming that it feels "lethargic" and "only finds momentum rarely". Multiple critics also disapproved of the album's derivative nature: Mikey Cahill of News.com.au claimed that "Stockdale rips riffs off everybody" on Victorious, while The Boston Globe's Marc Hirsh concluded that the album "simply colors within the lines drawn by others". Classic Rock magazine panned the album as "one man [Stockdale] putting a lot of effort into going absolutely nowhere", while AllMusic's Thom Jurek described it as "little more than a thrown-together mess". DIY reviewer Shefali Srivastava praised "Victorious", "City Lights" and "Gypsy Caravan", but concluded that the album is "too nice, too safe, and ultimately, too predictable".

== Track listing ==
All tracks are written by Andrew Stockdale, except where noted.

No.	Title	Writer(s)	Length
1.	"The Love That You Give"		2:38
2.	"Victorious"		4:24
3.	"Baroness"		3:15
4.	"Pretty Peggy"		3:49
5.	"City Lights"		3:51
6.	"The Simple Life"		3:12
7.	"Best of a Bad Situation"		3:07
8.	"Gypsy Caravan"	Stockdale; Kram	3:34
9.	"Happy Face"		3:31
10.	"Eye of the Beholder"		3:59
Total length:			35:20

Bonus tracks
No.	Title	Writer(s)	Length
11.	"Remove Your Mask"		3:56
12.	"Wedding"	Stockdale; Christoph Bartelt	3:21
Total length:			42:35

== Personnel ==
- Andrew Stockdale – vocals, guitar, bass
- Ian Peres – organ
- Josh Freese – drums (tracks 1, 2, 3, 4, 7, 9 and 10)
- Joey Waronker – drums (tracks 5, 6, 8, 11 and 12)
- Brendan O'Brien – production, mixing, additional percussion, organ, piano and guitar
- Tom Syrowski – engineering
- Kyle Stevens – engineering assistance
- Jason Galea – cover artwork, design
- Piper Ferguson – photography

== Charts ==
Chart (2016)	Peak position
Australian Albums (ARIA)	17
Austrian Albums (Ö3 Austria)	9
Belgian Albums (Ultratop Flanders)	35
Belgian Albums (Ultratop Wallonia)	49
Canadian Albums (Billboard)	33
Dutch Albums (Album Top 100)	20
Finnish Albums (Suomen virallinen lista)	34
French Albums (SNEP)	129
German Albums (Offizielle Top 100)	9
Italian Albums (FIMI)	92
Spanish Albums (Promusicae)	61
Swiss Albums (Schweizer Hitparade)	5
UK Albums (Official Charts)	25
UK Rock & Metal Albums (OCC)	1
US Billboard 200	71
US Top Alternative Albums (Billboard)	9
US Top Hard Rock Albums (Billboard)	2
US Top Rock Albums (Billboard)	11
US Indie Store Album Sales (Billboard)	8
