= Hamish Rosser =

Australian rock musician (born 1974)

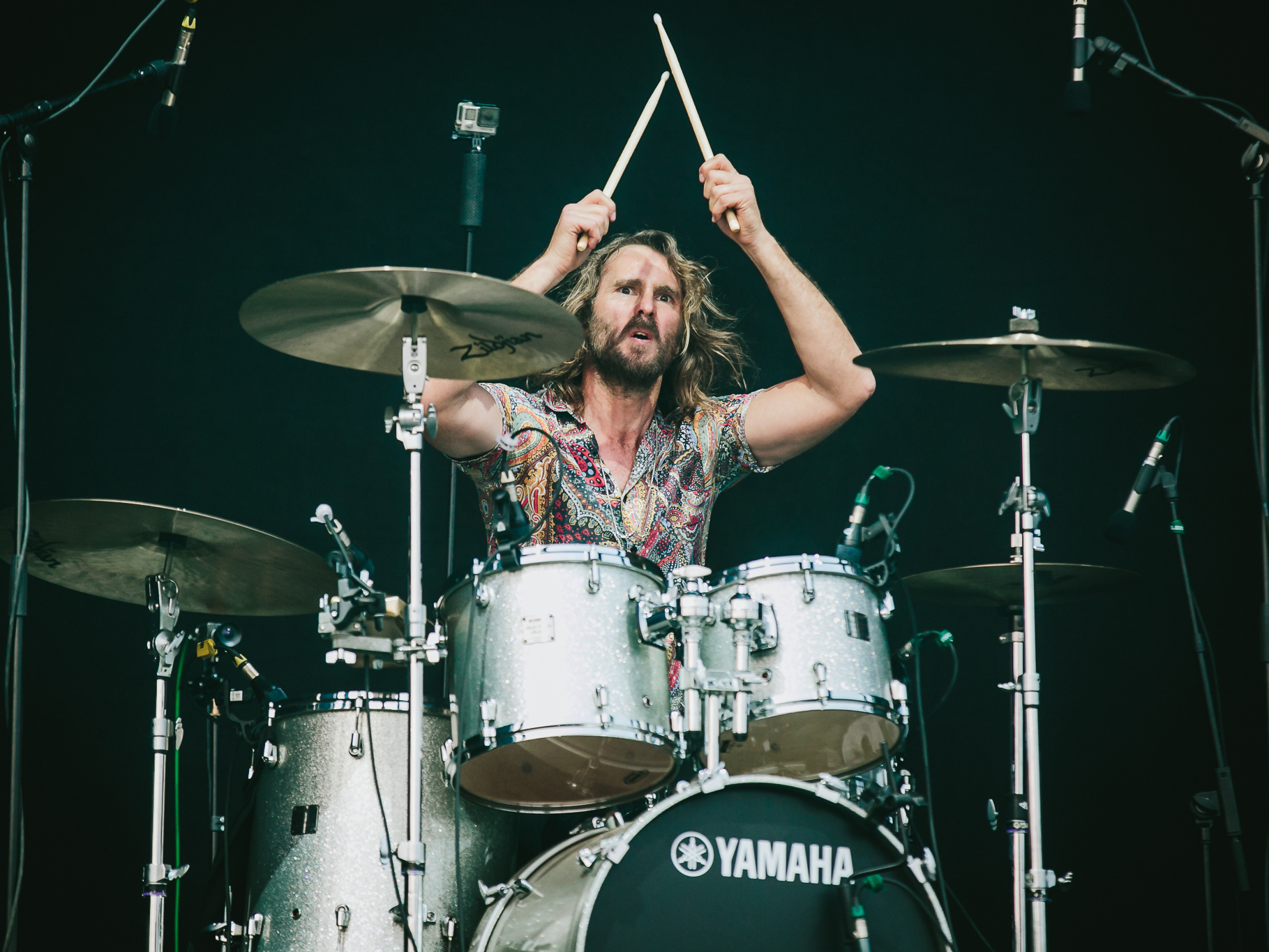
- Hamish Rosser performing with Wolfmother at Deichbrand Festival in 2018

Background information
- Born: Hamish Rosser; 16 May 1974 (age 52); Sydney, New South Wales, Australia
- Genres: Hard rock, alternative rock, garage rock revival, post-grunge, indie rock, neo-psychedelia
- Occupation: Drummer
- Instruments: Drums, percussion
- Years active: 2002–present

Hamish Rosser (born 16 May 1974) is an Australian rock musician. He is best known for his time in The Vines and Wolfmother.

== Early life ==
Hamish's musical journey began when he took up the guitar at the age of eight. By the time he turned eleven he had switched to drums and bought his first set of drums with money saved up from a paper round in his Sydney neighbourhood. Rosser's first gig was with high school punk band called "The Warthogs" who covered The Clash, The Ramones and the Sex Pistols.

Rosser studied chemical engineering at Sydney University and stayed there for four years until he left to pursue a career as a musician.

== Career ==
Rosser was asked to join The Vines to replace the band's previous drummer, David Oliffe. He left the Vines, along with guitarist Ryan Griffiths, in December 2011.

Rosser started touring with Australian hard rock band Wolfmother in 2012, where the band were looking to start working on their third studio album. After a year of touring with the band, Wolfmother split up temporarily while frontman Andrew Stockdale worked on his solo album Keep Moving. Rosser performed drums and percussion on several tracks for the album. However, before embarking on a tour for the album, Stockdale reformed Wolfmother and prepared a tour under the band's name instead performing both Wolfmother and his solo tracks.

Rosser left the band in 2013, then rejoined in 2017.

In 2016, Rosser joined children's rock 'n' roll band Bunny Racket, and performed with them at Splendour in the Grass in July of that year.

In 2023, Rosser rejoined the Vines to record a new record with Craig Nicholls.

== Personal life ==
Rosser and his wife Kristy's first child, Oscar Rosser, born in June 2012 in Queensland.

In 2011, Rosser was living in Redfern, New South Wales. In 2017, Rosser sold his Redfern house and moved to Byron Bay.

=== Skinny Blonde beer ===
In 2008, Rosser launched a beer called Skinny Blonde along with winemaker Richie Harkham and artist Jarod Taylor. The beer won the Peoples Choice awards at the 2008 Australian Beer Festival held at the Rocks in Sydney.

In June 2009, Skinny Blonde attracted national controversy across Australia over its beer bottle packaging which, through the use of modern ink technology, has a 1950s style pin up girl called Daisy on the beer bottle label, slowly revealing herself as the beer level drops and the bottle temperature rises. In response, Rosser stated,

This generation of Aussies have grown up on the beach and topless girls in bikinis are commonplace. The label and website is in no way meant to offend women or anyone else, rather embrace the Australian beach culture.

He was also quoted as saying that the beer was a "bit of cheeky fun".

== Discography ==
Studio albums

with The Vines

- Winning Days (2004)
- Vision Valley (2006)
- Melodia (2008)
- Future Primitive (2011)

with Andrew Stockdale

- Keep Moving (2013) AUS #32

with Wolfmother

- Rock Out (2021)
