= Keep Moving (Andrew Stockdale album) =

Studio album by Andrew Stockdale
- Released: 7 June 2013
- Recorded: 2011–2013
- Studios: Rockinghorse Studio, Spanish Casa, The Warehouse, and The Shed (Byron Bay, New South Wales)
- Genres: Hard rock, blues rock, neo-psychedelia, heavy metal
- Length: 72:53
- Labels: Universal, Caroline, Island
- Producer: Andrew Stockdale

Andrew Stockdale chronology
Keep Moving EP (2013)	Keep Moving (2013)

Singles from Keep Moving
- 1. "Long Way to Go" Released: 19 March 2013

Keep Moving is the debut solo studio album by Australian hard rock musician Andrew Stockdale. Initially conceived as the third album by Stockdale's band Wolfmother and recorded by the band's members, it was later announced as a solo album after the temporary disbandment of the group in March 2013. Keep Moving was released by Universal in June 2013.

== Background ==
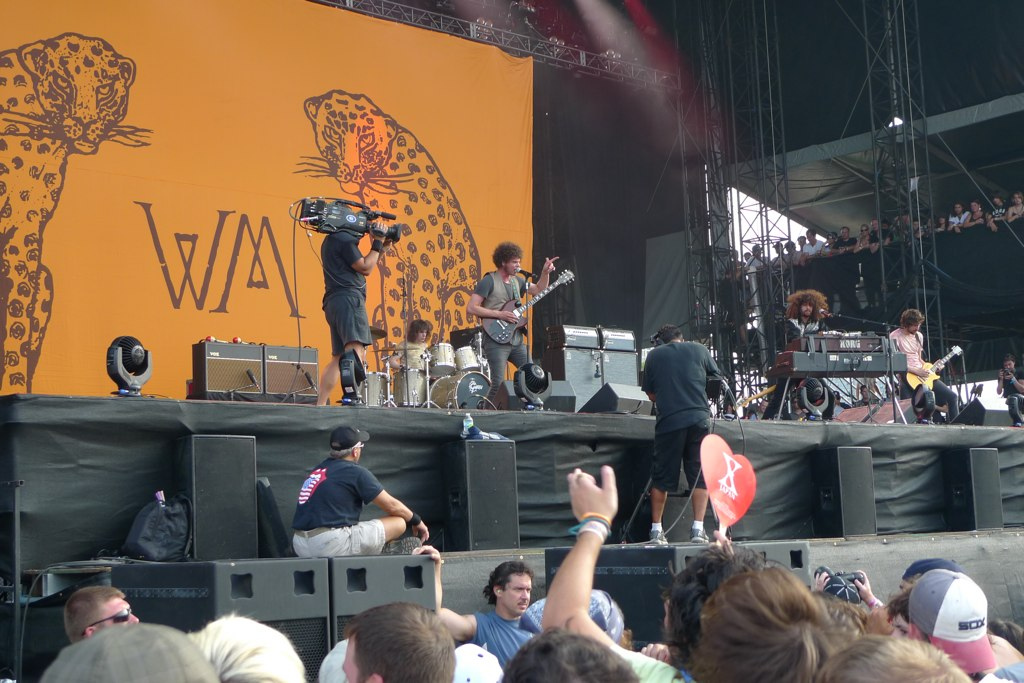
Wolfmother performing on the New Moon Rising World Tour in August 2010.

Following the release of their second album Cosmic Egg, which was mainly regarded favourably by critics, Wolfmother toured extensively on the New Moon Rising World Tour. Drummer Dave Atkins left the band in April 2010, and was replaced by Will Rockwell-Scott for the rest of the tour. News that the group were working on new material for a follow-up to Cosmic Egg was first revealed in March 2011, when a news post on the official website explained that the band were "hermiting [sic] in [their] home studio jamming away ... creating some good ol' foot stompin' hand clappin' rock'n' roll". Interviewed in June, frontman Andrew Stockdale revealed that "12 or 13 songs" for the album had been completed, produced by Stockdale and engineered by rhythm guitarist Aidan Nemeth, and that a November 2011 release date was likely. The album was said to have been completed in October, with just the mixing process to be completed, although the following month an early 2012 release date was predicted.

After relatively few updates regarding the fate of the album, it came to light in February 2012 that Nemeth and Rockwell-Scott had in fact left the band, and rumours emerged that there was a lack of interest in the album from the band's record labels. Remaining members Stockdale and Ian Peres enlisted the services of Vin Steele (rhythm guitar), Elliott Hammond (keyboards, percussion) and Hamish Rosser (drums) to complete the band lineup, and it was planned that the album would be re-recorded and self-released. The band returned to touring in March, performing new material at a number of shows, including the songs "Long Way to Go", "Keep Moving", and "Of the Earth". At the end of October the band broke their three-month silence, revealing with the news of another show that the album would be released in 2013.

On 14 November 2012, frontman Andrew Stockdale shared on Twitter a video performance of a new song, entitled "One More Time", which he revealed would be included on the band's upcoming third album. Later in December, Stockdale revealed that after "about 15 months of on-and-off recording in about four or five different locations", there were eight songs recorded, mixed and mastered for the album, which he predicted would comprise a total of 12 tracks. In his last published interview of 2012 the vocalist and guitarist went into more depth with regard to the production of the album, speaking about stylistic influences, the recording process (including personnel and locations), and the songwriting. On 6 March 2013, frontman Andrew Stockdale announced that he would be releasing the new album under his own name, not that of the band. He described the album as "a different trip now", putting the future of Wolfmother as a band in doubt. He later confirmed that the Wolfmother band name would no longer be used, confirming that the current lineup would continue under his own name as a solo project.

== Promotion ==
Keep Moving was announced by Stockdale immediately after the news of Wolfmother's disbandment on 6 March 2013. A rough copy of the album, produced in late 2012 and released under the Wolfmother name, was made available for streaming for 24 hours on 7 March 2013 on SoundCloud, before the album was officially announced for release on 25 March 2013. "Long Way to Go" was released on 7 March 2013 as a promotional single from Keep Moving, available to stream on Tumblr.

== Track listing ==
All tracks are written by Andrew Stockdale, except where noted.

United States CD edition
No.	Title	Length
1.	"Long Way to Go"	4:48
2.	"Keep Moving"	3:01
3.	"Somebody's Calling" (co-written by Elliott Hammond)	3:49
4.	"Vicarious"	4:48
5.	"Year of the Dragon"	4:50
6.	"Meridian" (co-written by Ian Peres)	4:59
7.	"Ghetto"	5:25
8.	"Of the Earth"	4:20
9.	"Let It Go"	4:50
10.	"Let Somebody Love You"	3:16
11.	"She's a Motorhead"	3:44
12.	"Standing on the Corner"	2:48
13.	"Country"	3:48
14.	"Black Swan"	4:22

United Kingdom standard and Canadian CD editions
No.	Title	Length
1.	"Long Way to Go"	4:48
2.	"Keep Moving"	3:01
3.	"Somebody's Calling" (co-written by Elliott Hammond)	3:49
4.	"Vicarious"	4:48
5.	"Year of the Dragon"	4:50
6.	"Meridian" (co-written by Ian Peres)	4:59
7.	"Ghetto"	5:25
8.	"Suitcase (One More Time)"	5:16
9.	"Of the Earth"	4:20
10.	"Let It Go"	4:50
11.	"Let Somebody Love You"	3:16
12.	"She's a Motorhead"	3:44
13.	"Standing on the Corner"	2:48
14.	"Country"	3:48
15.	"Black Swan"	4:22
16.	"Everyday Drone"	4:45

International iTunes digital download edition
No.	Title	Length
17.	"Keep Moving" (banjo version)	3:35

Deluxe edition bonus track
No.	Title	Length
17.	"It Occurred to Me"	4:15

Track-by-track edition
No.	Title	Length
1.	"Track By Track: Long Way to Go"	1:14
2.	"Long Way to Go"	4:48
3.	"Track By Track: Keep Moving"	1:54
4.	"Keep Moving"	3:01
5.	"Track By Track: Somebody's Calling"	1:29
6.	"Somebody's Calling"	3:49
7.	"Track By Track: Vicarious"	1:37
8.	"Vicarious"	4:48
9.	"Track By Track: Year of the Dragon"	1:22
10.	"Year of the Dragon"	4:50
11.	"Track By Track: Meridian"	1:11
12.	"Meridian"	4:59
13.	"Track By Track: Ghetto"	1:10
14.	"Ghetto"	5:25
15.	"Track By Track: Suitcase (One More Time)"	1:49
16.	"Suitcase (One More Time)"	5:16
17.	"Track By Track: Of the Earth"	1:32
18.	"Of the Earth"	4:20
19.	"Track By Track: Let It Go"	1:28
20.	"Let It Go"	4:50
21.	"Track By Track: Let Somebody Love You"	1:49
22.	"Let Somebody Love You"	3:16
23.	"Track By Track: She's a Motorhead"	1:44
24.	"She's a Motorhead"	3:44
25.	"Track By Track: Standing on the Corner"	1:24
26.	"Standing on the Corner"	2:48
27.	"Track By Track: Country"	1:46
28.	"Country"	3:48
29.	"Track By Track: Black Swan"	1:48
30.	"Black Swan"	4:22
31.	"Track By Track: Everyday Drone"	2:16
32.	"Everyday Drone"	4:46
33.	"Track By Track: It Occurred to Me"	1:33
34.	"It Occurred to Me"	4:15
35.	"Track By Track: End Comment"	0:48

Bandcamp Version
No.	Title	Length
1.	"Keep Moving"	3:01
2.	"Somebody's Calling" (co-written by Elliott Hammond)	3:49
3.	"Vicarious"	4:48
4.	"Meridian" (co-written by Ian Peres)	4:59
5.	"Ghetto"	5:25
6.	"Of the Earth"	4:20
7.	"Let It Go"	4:50
8.	"Let Somebody Love You"	3:16
9.	"Standing on the Corner"	2:48
10.	"Country"	3:48
11.	"Black Swan"	4:22

== Personnel ==
Musical personnel

- Andrew Stockdale – vocals (all tracks), guitars (all tracks), harmonica (tracks 14, 16), organ (track 3), bass (track 4)
- Ian Peres – bass (all tracks except 4 and 7) organ (tracks 1, 3, 5, 6, 9, 13–16), Wurlitzer electric piano (tracks 1, 5, 7, 11, 15, 16), Fender Rhodes piano (tracks 9, 10) backing vocals (tracks 14, 15), shaker (tracks 15, 16), Moog synthesizer (track 9), banjo (track 16), Pro Tools editing (all tracks except 4, 7, 8)
- Elliott Hammond – drums (tracks 3, 4, 7, 11), Wurlitzer electric piano (tracks 1, 8, 9), congas (tracks 1, 9, 12), harmonica (tracks 12, 17)
- Vin Steele – rhythm guitar (tracks 1, 8, 9, 12, 17), bass (track 7)
- Hamish Rosser – drums (tracks 1, 8, 9, 12, 17)
- Will Rockwell-Scott – drums (tracks 2, 5, 6, 13–16)
- Dave Atkins – drums (track 10), Overdubs and editing (all tracks except 8)
- Alex "Rudy" Markwell – rhythm guitar (track 3), Wurlitzer electric piano (track 4)
- Joe Howman – trumpet and flugelhorn (track 15)

Production personnel

- Vance Powell – mixing
- Chris Athens – mastering
- Nicolas Wilson – engineering (tracks 1, 3, 4, 7, 9, 11, 12, 17)
- Aidan Nemeth – engineering (tracks 2, 5–6, 13–16)
- Kevin Garci-Fernandez – engineering (track 8), engineering assistance (tracks 1, 9, 11–12, 17)
- Justin Tressider – engineering (track 10)

Artwork personnel

- Jude Robinson – design
- Michael Crawley – photography

== Charts ==
Chart (2013)	Peak position
Australian Albums (ARIA)	32

== Release history ==
Region	Date	Format	Label	Catalog	Ref.
International	7 June 2013	Digital download	Universal Music	none	
International	7 June 2013	Compact Disc	Universal Music	3737878	
United Kingdom	10 June 2013	Compact disc (standard edition)	Universal Music	3737878	
United States	11 June 2013	Compact disc	Caroline Records	2537416400	
Canada	2 July 2013	Compact disc	Universal Music	3737878	
