= List of songs recorded by Wolfmother =

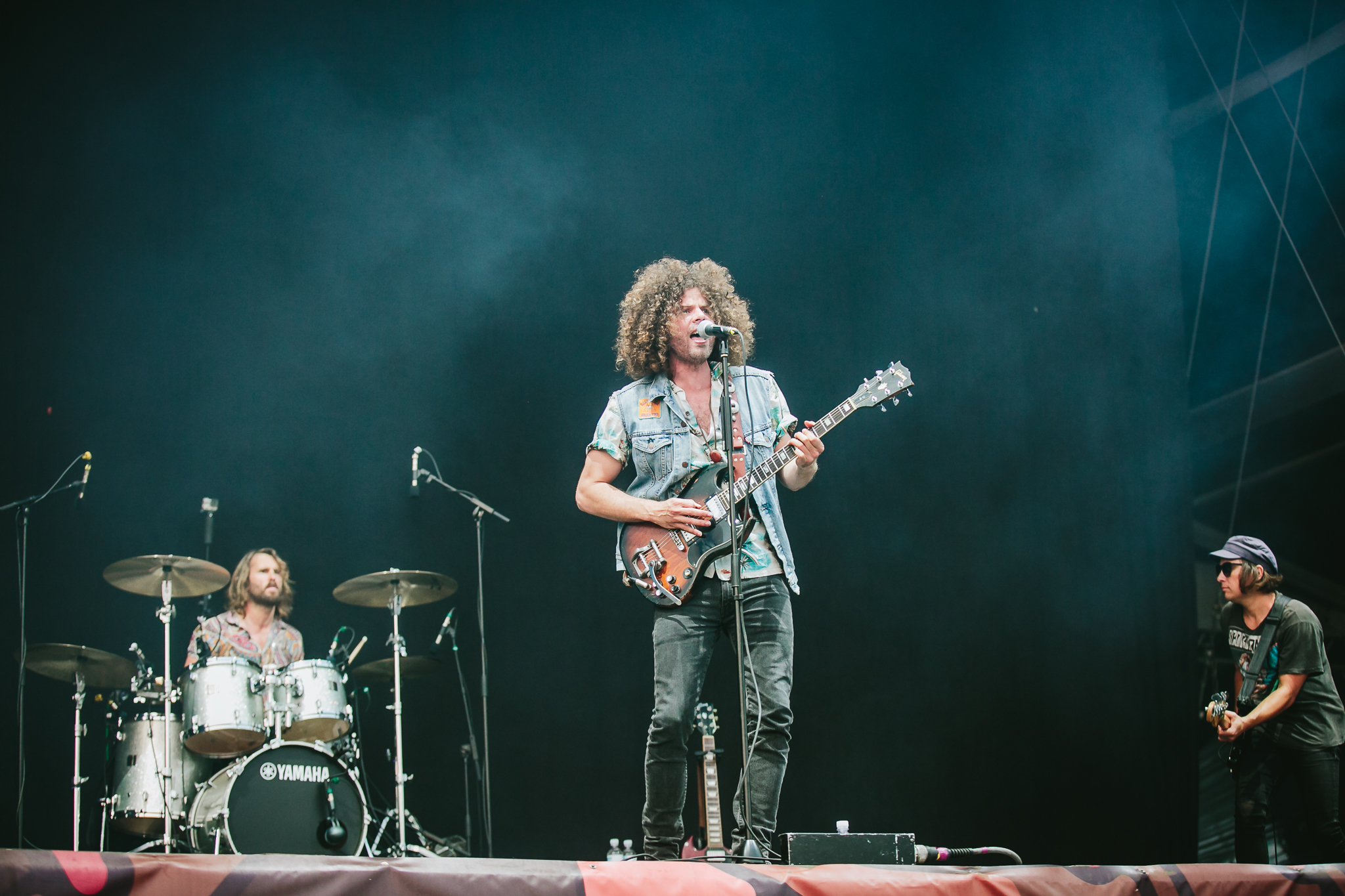
Wolfmother performing in 2018.

Wolfmother are an Australian hard rock band formed in Sydney, New South Wales in 2000. Originally a trio featuring vocalist and guitarist Andrew Stockdale, bassist and keyboardist Chris Ross, and drummer Myles Heskett, the group released their self-titled debut album in Australia in 2005, with all 12 tracks credited equally to all three band members. Four songs – "Dimension", "Woman", "White Unicorn" and "Apple Tree" – had originally been released on the band's self-titled debut EP the previous year. When Wolfmother was released internationally in 2006, it also featured "Love Train". In May 2007, the band contributed "Pleased to Meet You" to the Spider-Man 3 soundtrack.

Ross and Heskett left Wolfmother in August 2008. Returning with new members Ian Peres (bass, keyboards), Aidan Nemeth (rhythm guitar) and Dave Atkins (drums), the band released the single "Back Round" in March 2009, followed by their second album Cosmic Egg in October, the songwriting for which was credited entirely to Stockdale. In March 2010, the band contributed the song "Fell Down a Hole" to the Almost Alice soundtrack, before Atkins announced his departure the following month.

With Will Rockwell-Scott replacing Atkins, Wolfmother began working on their third album in 2011, although the resulting album Keep Moving was eventually released in 2013 as Andrew Stockdale's solo debut. The band returned later in the year as a trio composed of Stockdale, Peres and drummer Vin Steele, and began working on their official third album. New Crown was released independently in March 2014, featuring ten songs written by Stockdale. The band's fourth album Victorious was released in February 2016, with songwriting again credited to Stockdale alone (with the exception of "Gypsy Caravan", which was co-written by Spiderbait drummer Kram).

== Songs ==
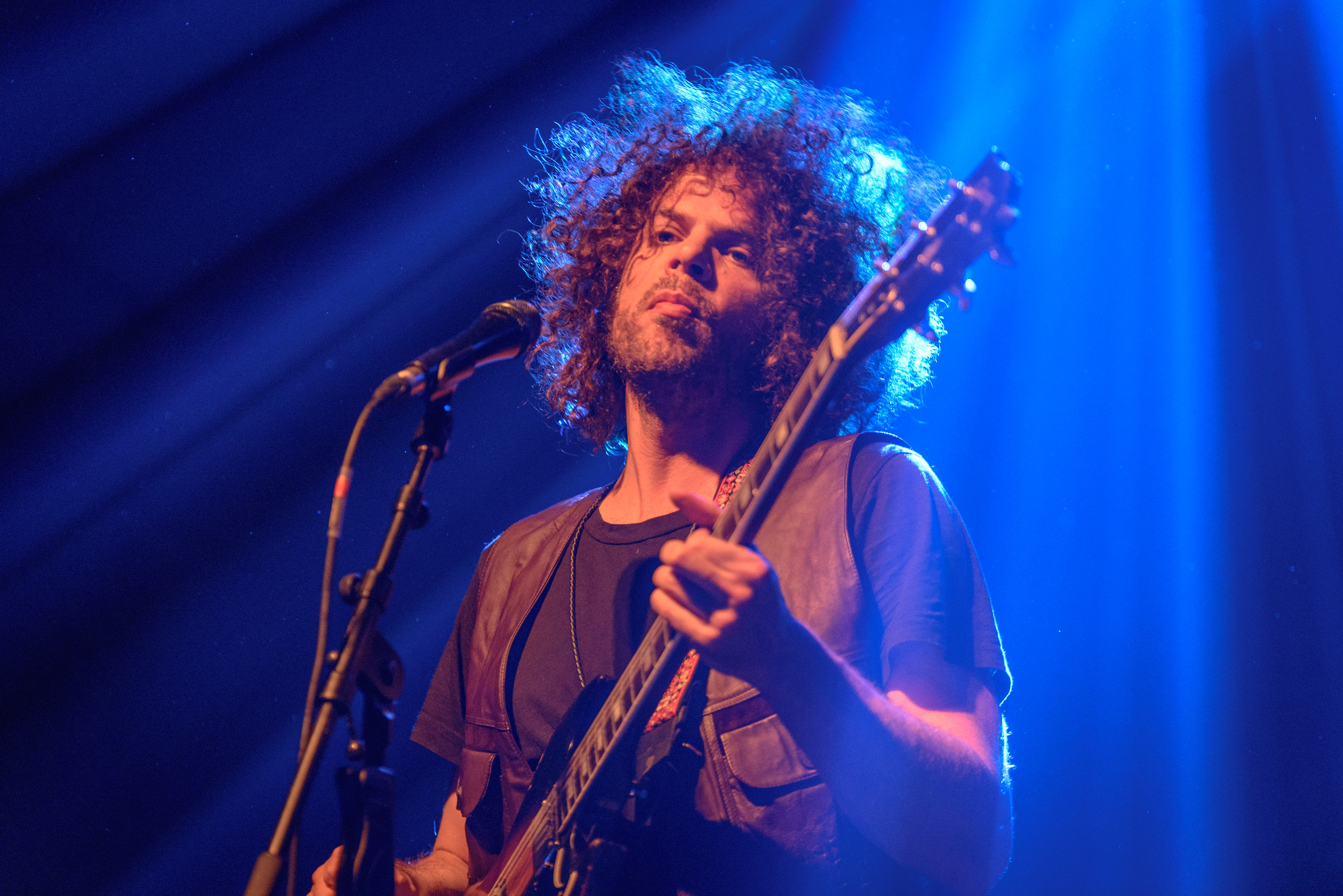
Andrew Stockdale has been credited with writing all of the band's material from Cosmic Egg onwards.

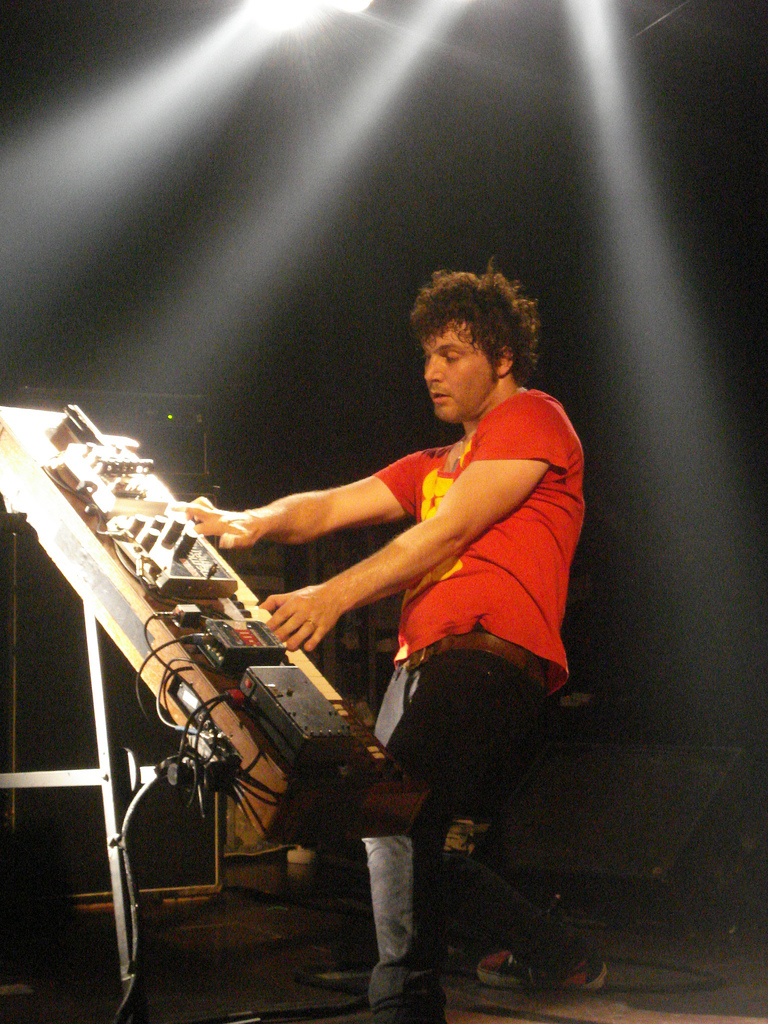
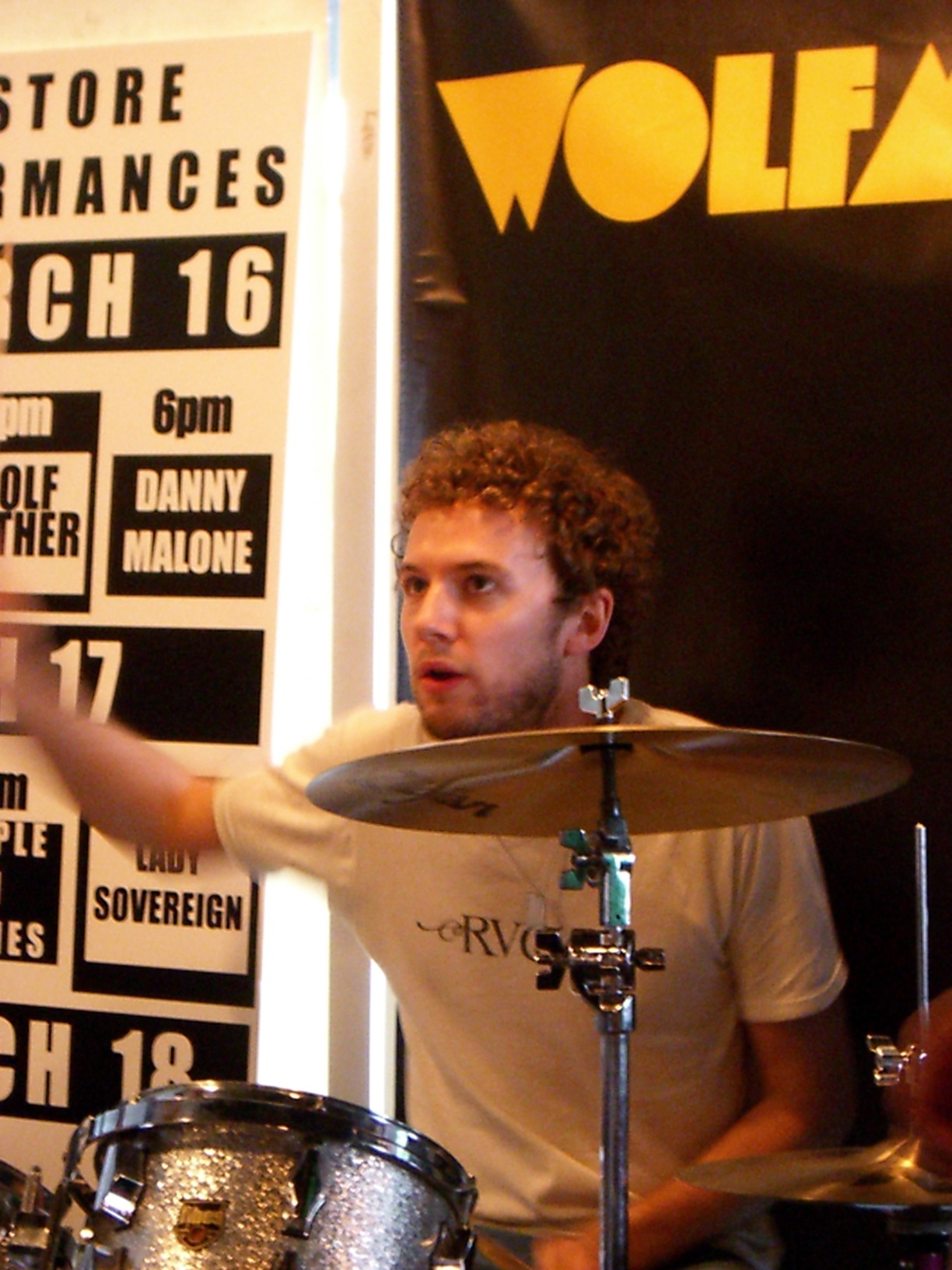
Original members Chris Ross and Myles Heskett were credited with co-writing the songs on 2005's Wolfmother.

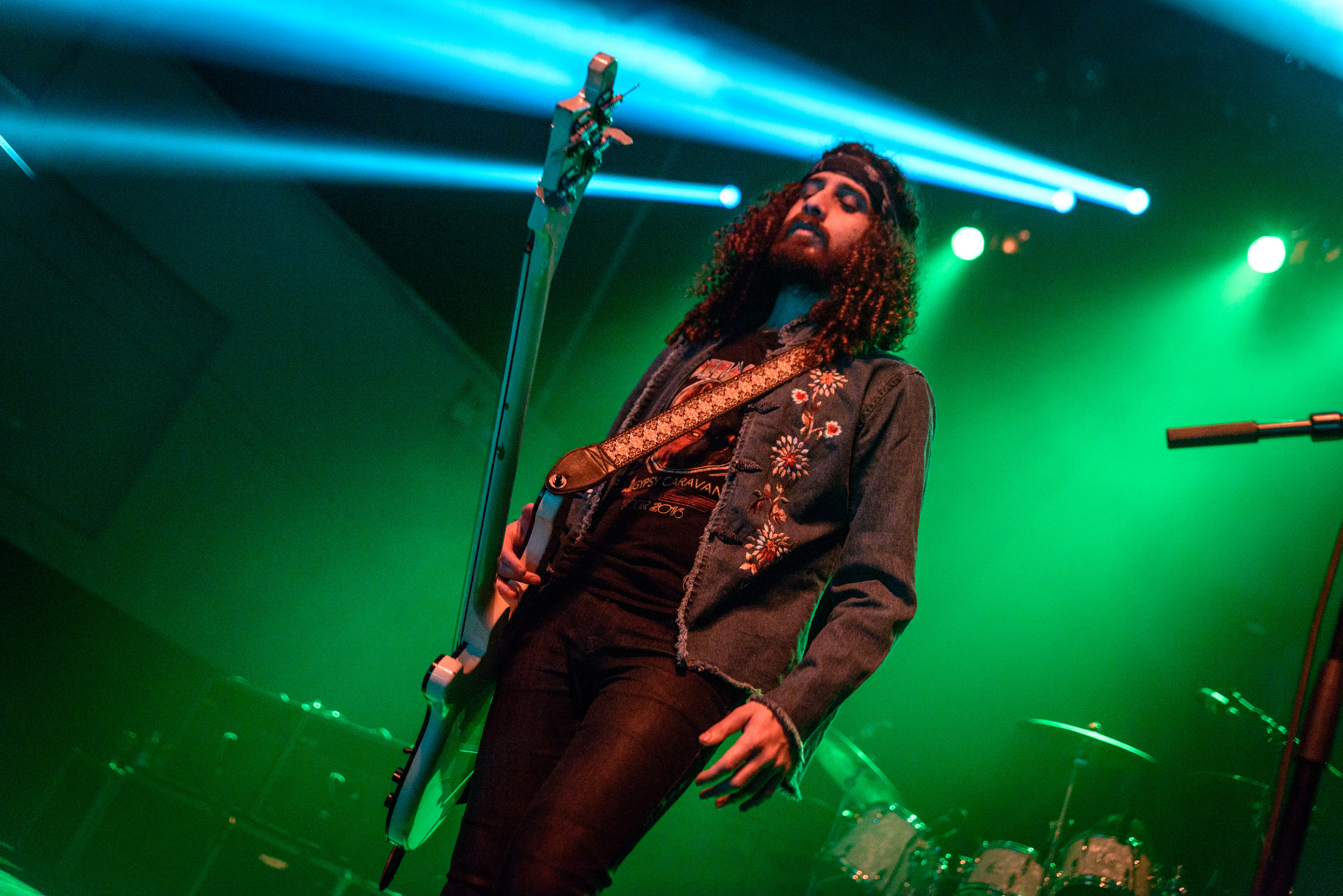
Ian Peres joined Wolfmother in 2009 and has performed on every one of their releases from Cosmic Egg.

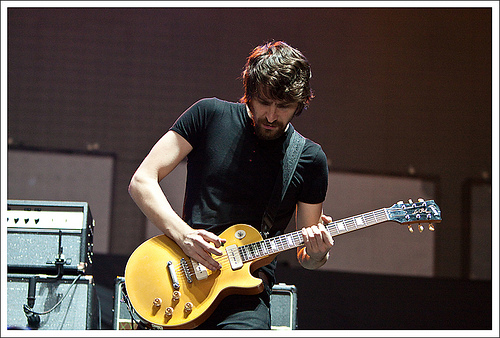
Aidan Nemeth performed rhythm guitar on 2009's Cosmic Egg.

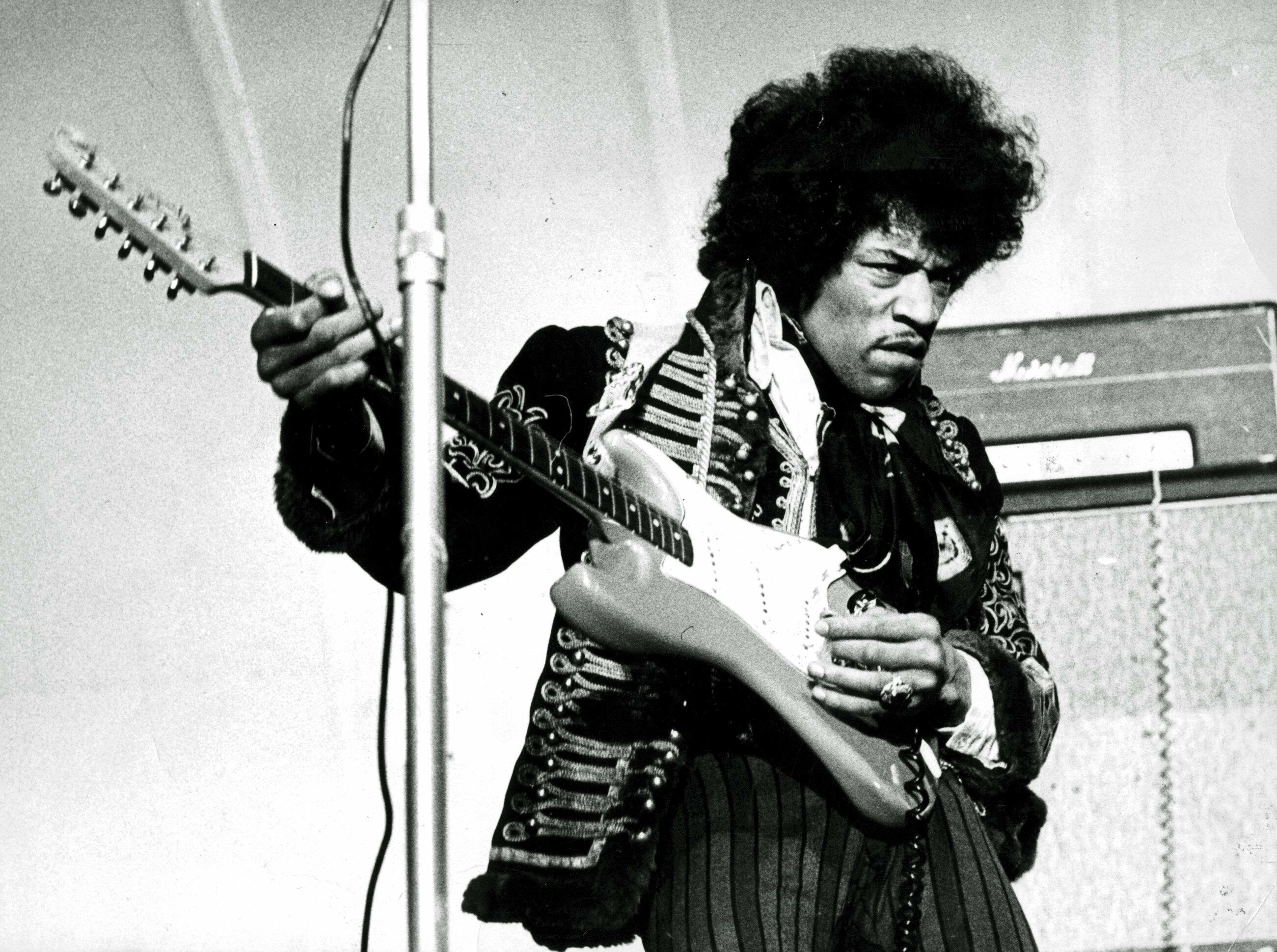
The band covered Jimi Hendrix's "If 6 Was 9" and released it as a Cosmic Egg bonus track.

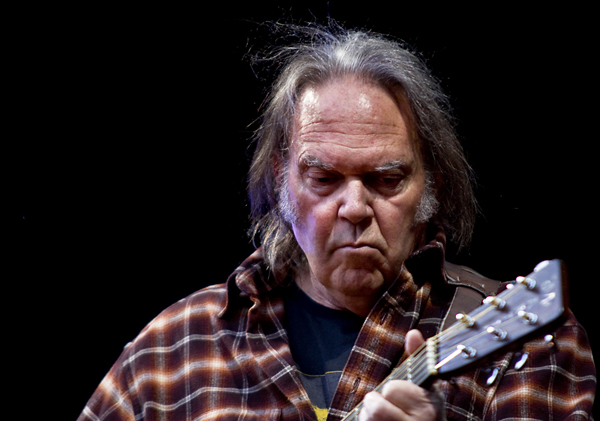
A cover version of Neil Young's "Don't Let It Bring You Down" was also released on Cosmic Egg.

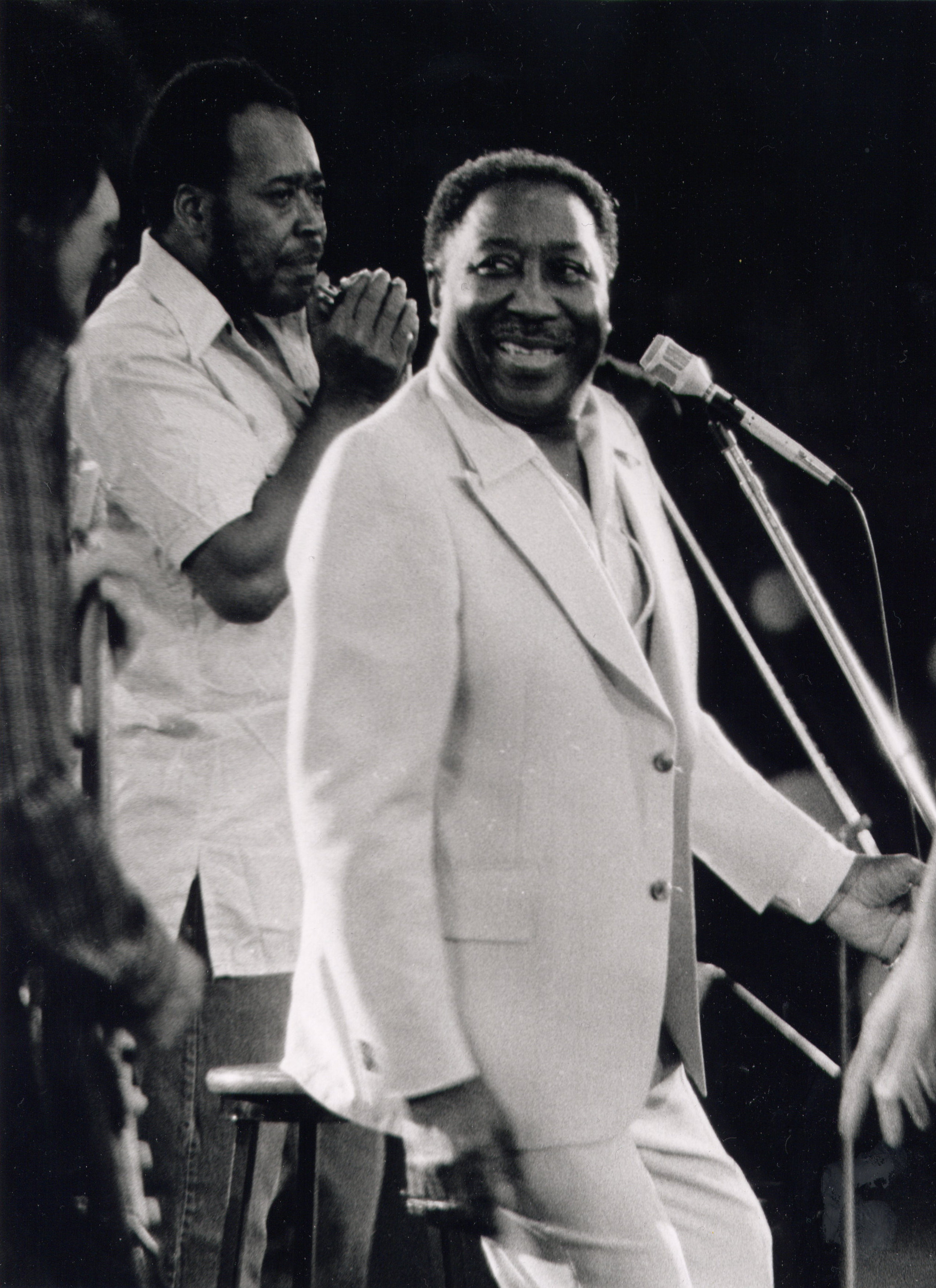
"Mannish Boy", originally performed by Muddy Waters, was another Cosmic Egg bonus track.

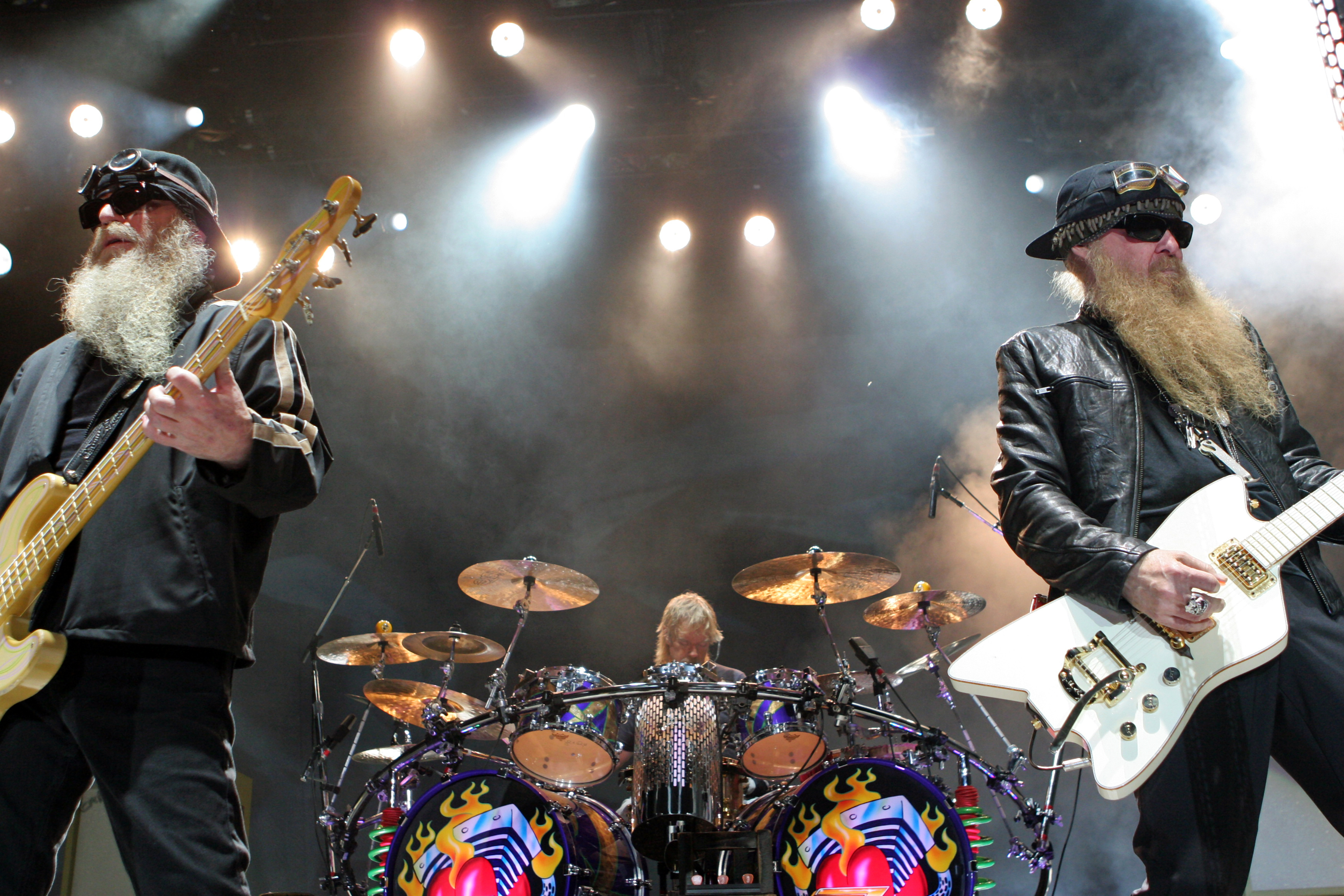
Wolfmother contributed a cover version of ZZ Top's "Cheap Sunglasses" to a tribute album in 2011.

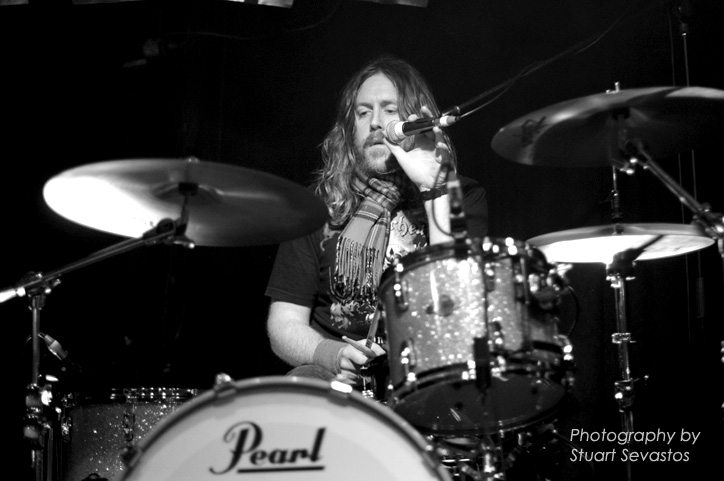
Spiderbait member Kram co-wrote Victorious track "Gypsy Caravan".

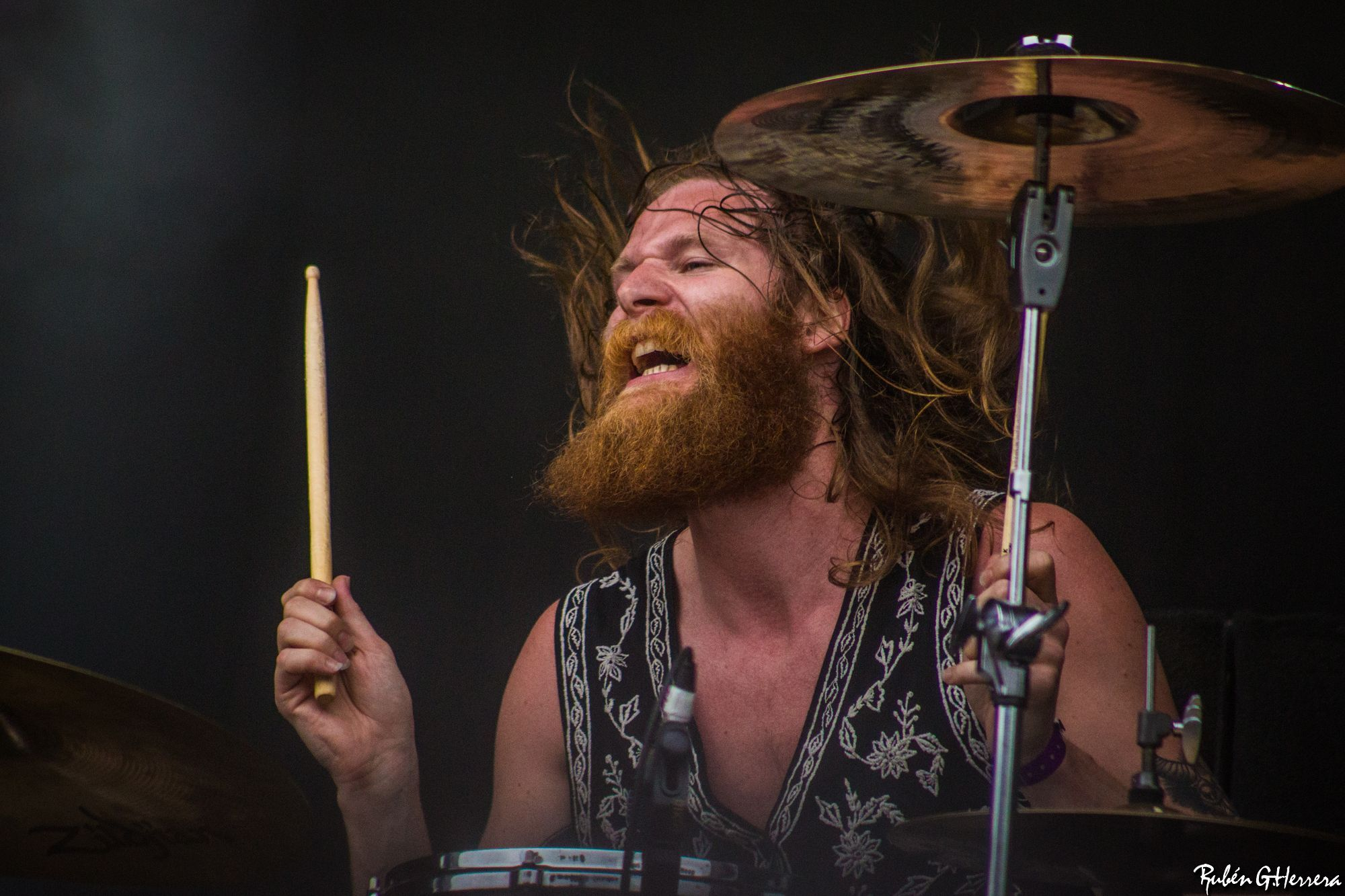
Victorious bonus track "Wedding" was co-written by Kadavar drummer Christoph "Tiger" Bartelt.

Key
†	Indicates song released as a single
‡	Indicates song written solely by Andrew Stockdale

Title	Writer(s)	Release	Year	Ref.
"10,000 Feet"	Andrew Stockdale ‡	Cosmic Egg	2009	
"Apple Tree"	Andrew Stockdale; Chris Ross; Myles Heskett	Wolfmother (later Wolfmother, 2005)	2004	
"Back Round" † (also known as "Back Home")	Andrew Stockdale ‡	Cosmic Egg (special editions)	2009	
"Baroness"	Andrew Stockdale ‡	Victorious	2016	
"Best of a Bad Situation"	Andrew Stockdale ‡	Victorious	2016	
"California Queen"	Andrew Stockdale ‡	Cosmic Egg	2009	
"Caroline"	Andrew Stockdale ‡	Cosmic Egg (special editions)	2009	
"Cheap Sunglasses" (ZZ Top cover)	Billy Gibbons; Dusty Hill; Frank Beard	ZZ Top: A Tribute from Friends	2011	
"City Lights"	Andrew Stockdale ‡	Victorious	2016	
"Colossal"	Andrew Stockdale; Chris Ross; Myles Heskett	Wolfmother	2005	
"Cosmic Egg"	Andrew Stockdale ‡	Cosmic Egg	2009	
"Cosmonaut"	Andrew Stockdale ‡	Cosmic Egg (special editions)	2009	
"Dimension" †	Andrew Stockdale; Chris Ross; Myles Heskett	Wolfmother (later Wolfmother, 2005)	2004	
"Don't Let It Bring You Down" (Neil Young cover)	Neil Young	Cosmic Egg (special editions)	2009	
"The Earth's Rotation Around the Sun"	Andrew Stockdale; Chris Ross; Myles Heskett	"Mind's Eye"	2005	
"Enemy Is in Your Mind"	Andrew Stockdale ‡	New Crown	2014	
"Eye of the Beholder"	Andrew Stockdale ‡	Victorious	2016	
"Eyes Open"	Andrew Stockdale ‡	Cosmic Egg (special editions)	2009	
"Far Away" †	Andrew Stockdale ‡	Cosmic Egg	2009	
"Feelings"	Andrew Stockdale ‡	New Crown	2014	
"Fell Down a Hole" (also known as "Fell Down in a Hole")	Andrew Stockdale ‡	Almost Alice	2010	
"Freedom Is Mine" †	Andrew Stockdale ‡	non-album single	2017	
"Gypsy Caravan"	Andrew Stockdale; Mark Maher	Victorious	2016	
"Happy Face"	Andrew Stockdale ‡	Victorious	2016	
"Heavy Weight"	Andrew Stockdale ‡	New Crown	2014	
"Highway" (also known as "Highway Lady" and "My Way or the Highway")	Andrew Stockdale ‡	Gran Turismo 6	2013	
"How Many Times"	Andrew Stockdale ‡	New Crown	2014	
"I Ain't Got No"	Andrew Stockdale ‡	New Crown	2014	
"I Don't Know Why"	Andrew Stockdale ‡	New Crown (special editions)	2014	
"If 6 Was 9" (The Jimi Hendrix Experience cover)	Jimi Hendrix	Cosmic Egg (special editions)	2009	
"In the Castle"	Andrew Stockdale ‡	Cosmic Egg	2009	
"In the Morning"	Andrew Stockdale ‡	Cosmic Egg	2009	
"Joker & the Thief" † (also known as "Not Goin' Home")	Andrew Stockdale; Chris Ross; Myles Heskett	Wolfmother	2005	
"The Love That You Give"	Andrew Stockdale ‡	Victorious	2016	
"Love Train" †	Andrew Stockdale; Chris Ross; Myles Heskett	Wolfmother (international editions)	2006	
"Lucky Star"	Andrew Stockdale ‡	New Crown (special editions)	2014	
"Mannish Boy" (Muddy Waters cover)	Muddy Waters; Mel London; Bo Diddley	Cosmic Egg (special editions)	2009	
"Mind's Eye" †	Andrew Stockdale; Chris Ross; Myles Heskett	Wolfmother	2005	
"My Tangerine Dream"	Andrew Stockdale ‡	New Crown	2014	
"New Crown"	Andrew Stockdale ‡	New Crown	2014	
"New Moon Rising" †	Andrew Stockdale ‡	Cosmic Egg	2009	
"Phoenix"	Andrew Stockdale ‡	Cosmic Egg	2009	
"Pilgrim"	Andrew Stockdale; Jason Simon; Steve Kille; Mark Laughlin	Cosmic Egg	2009	
"Pleased to Meet You" (also known as "Love Attacker")	Andrew Stockdale; Chris Ross; Myles Heskett	Spider-Man 3	2007	
"Pretty Peggy"	Andrew Stockdale ‡	Victorious	2016	
"Pyramid"	Andrew Stockdale; Chris Ross; Myles Heskett	Wolfmother	2005	
"Radio"	Andrew Stockdale ‡	New Crown	2014	
"Remove Your Mask"	Andrew Stockdale ‡	Victorious (special editions)	2016	
"She Got It"	Andrew Stockdale ‡	New Crown	2014	
"The Simple Life"	Andrew Stockdale ‡	Victorious	2016	
"Sundial"	Andrew Stockdale ‡	Cosmic Egg	2009	
"Tales from the Forest of Gnomes" (also known simply as "Tales")	Andrew Stockdale; Chris Ross; Myles Heskett	Wolfmother	2005	
"Tall Ships"	Andrew Stockdale ‡	New Crown	2014	
"Vagabond"	Andrew Stockdale; Chris Ross; Myles Heskett	Wolfmother	2005	
"Victorious" †	Andrew Stockdale ‡	Victorious	2016	
"Violence of the Sun"	Andrew Stockdale ‡	Cosmic Egg	2009	
"Wedding"	Andrew Stockdale; Christoph Bartelt	Victorious (special editions)	2016	
"Where Eagles Have Been"	Andrew Stockdale; Chris Ross; Myles Heskett	Wolfmother	2005	
"White Feather" †	Andrew Stockdale ‡	Cosmic Egg	2009	
"White Unicorn" †	Andrew Stockdale; Chris Ross; Myles Heskett	Wolfmother (later Wolfmother, 2005)	2004	
"Witchcraft"	Andrew Stockdale; Chris Ross; Myles Heskett	Wolfmother	2005	
"Woman" †	Andrew Stockdale; Chris Ross; Myles Heskett	Wolfmother (later Wolfmother, 2005)	2004	

== See also ==
- Wolfmother discography
