= List of awards and nominations received by Wolfmother =

Wolfmother awards and nominations
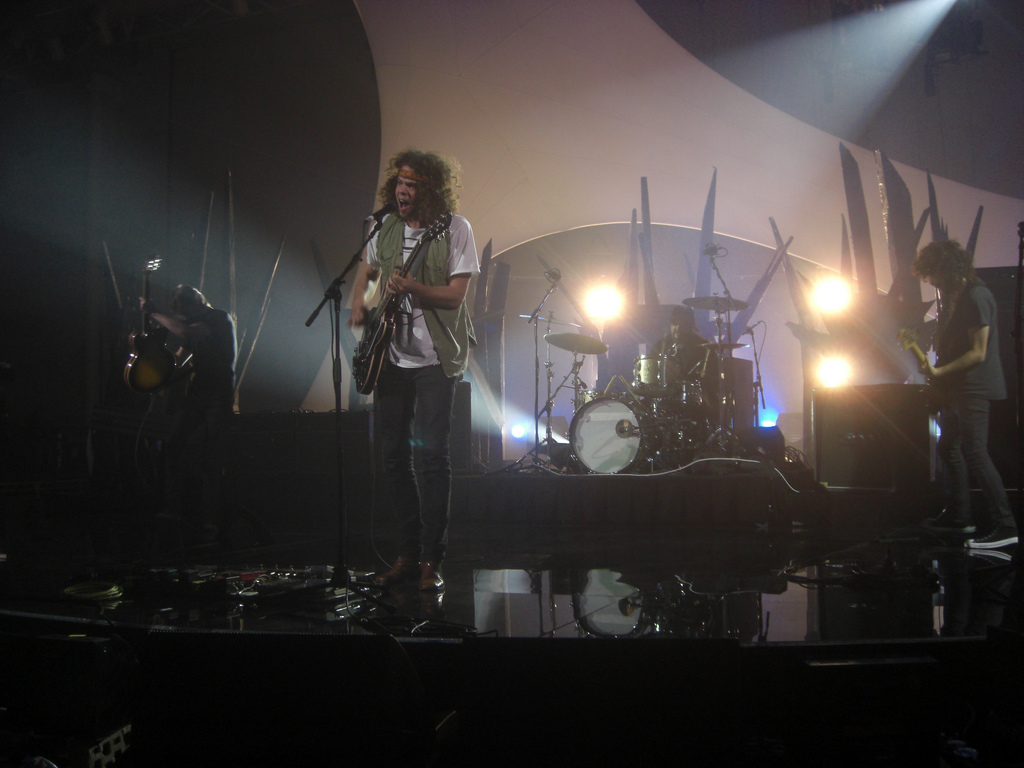
- Wolfmother performing at the MTV Australia Awards on 27 March 2009
Awards and nominations
Award	Wins	Nominations
APRA	3	3
ARIA	3	10
Brit	0	1
Grammy	1	1
J	1	1
Jack	1	2
MTV Australia	0	7
Canadian Indie Music Awards	0	1
Channel [V] Oz Artist of the Year	1	1
Triple J Hottest 100	13	13

Totals (Note: Certain award groups do not simply award one winner. They acknowledge several different recipients, have runners-up, and have third place. Since this is a specific recognition and is different from losing an award, runner-up mentions are considered wins in this award tally. For simplification and to avoid errors, each award in this list has been presumed to have had a prior nomination.)
- Wins: 23
- Nominations: 40

Wolfmother are an Australian hard rock band formed in 2000 by vocalist and guitarist Andrew Stockdale, bassist and keyboardist Chris Ross, and drummer Myles Heskett. They have released three studio albums: Wolfmother (October 2005); Cosmic Egg (October 2009) and New Crown (March 2014). Wolfmother has won national and international awards, including three Australian Recording Industry Association (ARIA) Music Awards, three Australasian Performing Right Association (APRA) Awards and one Grammy Award.

Their self-titled debut album won the 2005 J Award for Best Australian Album. A song from the album, "Woman" was nominated for Single of the Year and Best Breakthrough Artist – Single at the ARIA Awards, eventually losing out to Ben Lee's "Catch My Disease" and End of Fashion's "O Yeah", respectively. The following year, the album won the ARIA Award for Best Breakthrough Album, Best Rock Album, and the band won for Best Group; they also received nominations for Album of the Year (for Wolfmother) and Single of the Year (for "Mind's Eye"). In the same year, Wolfmother received nominations for Spankin' New Aussie Artist, Best New Group and Best Rock Video (for "Mind's Eye") at the MTV Australia Awards and a Jack Award nomination for Best Live Band.

Wolfmother were nominated for International Breakthrough Act at the 2007 BRIT Awards, ultimately losing out to American band Orson. At the 2007 Grammy Awards the band won the Grammy Award for Best Hard Rock Performance for their song "Woman". They were the first Australian band in twenty five years to win this award. In the same year, they also received the Jack Award for Best Live Band, and were nominated for four MTV Australia Awards: Best Group, Viewer's Choice Award, Best Rock Video and Video of the Year (the latter two for the song "Joker & the Thief"). The following year, Wolfmother garnered the APRA Award for Most Played Australian Work Overseas, for their song "Woman". The band's second album, Cosmic Egg (2009) received a nomination in 2010 for Album of the Year in Classic Rock magazine's Roll of Honour.

== APRA Awards ==
The annual APRA Awards have been presented by the Australasian Performing Right Association (APRA) and Australasian Mechanical Copyright Owners Society (AMCOS) since 1997, and previously, by APRA alone, since 1982. APRA-AMCOS are the copyright collection agencies for Australian and New Zealand artists. They have provided trophies for "songwriters and publishers that have achieved outstanding success in their fields" within Australia in thirteen categories with nine (including Most Played Australian Work Overseas) based on statistical analysis, three categories (including Breakthrough Songwriter Award and Songwriter of the Year) are decided by APRA's Board of Directors and the final award (Song of the Year) is determined by a poll of APRA members (comprising some 87,000 songwriters, composers and music publishers). Wolfmother have received three awards from three nominations.

Year	Recipient / Nominated work	Award	Result	Ref.
2006	Andrew Stockdale, Chris Ross, Myles Heskett	Breakthrough Songwriter Award	Won	
2007	Andrew Stockdale, Chris Ross, Myles Heskett	Songwriter of the Year	Won	
2008	"Woman"	Most Played Australian Work Overseas	Won	
2021	"Chase the Feeling"	Most Performed Rock Work	Nominated	

== ARIA Music Awards ==
Since 1987 the annual ARIA Music Awards have been presented by the Australian Recording Industry Association (ARIA), which is "the peak trade body for the recorded music industry" in that country. In 2009, out of 28 categories 26 were peer-voted: genre categories are judged by "voting schools" that consist of 40–100 representatives from that genre; generalist categories are determined by the "voting academy", which had 1106 representatives from across the music industry. Two other categories – Highest Selling Album and Highest Selling Single – were based on "audited sales results." Wolfmother have received three awards from ten nominations.

Year	Recipient / Nominated work	Award	Result	Ref.
2005	"Woman"	Single of the Year	Nominated	
2005	"Woman"	Breakthrough Artist – Single	Nominated	
2006	Wolfmother	Breakthrough Artist – Album	Won	
2006	Wolfmother	Best Rock Album	Won	
2006	Wolfmother	Album of the Year	Nominated	
2006	Wolfmother	Best Group	Won	
2006	"Mind's Eye"	Single of the Year	Nominated	
2007	Wolfmother	Best Group	Nominated	
2007	"Joker & the Thief"	Highest Selling Single	Nominated	
2008	Please Experience Wolfmother Live	Best Music DVD	Nominated	

== MTV Australia Awards ==
The annual MTV Australia Awards have been presented by television channel, MTV Australia, since 2005, with categories voted for by its viewers. Wolfmother have received seven nominations.

Year	Recipient / Nominated work	Award	Result	Ref.
2006	Wolfmother	Spankin' New Aussie Artist	Nominated	
2006	Wolfmother	Best Group	Nominated	
2006	"Mind's Eye"	Best Rock Video	Nominated	
2007	Wolfmother	Best Group	Nominated	
2007	Wolfmother	Viewers' Choice Award	Nominated	
2007	"Joker & the Thief"	Best Rock Video	Nominated	
2007	"Joker & the Thief"	Video of the Year	Nominated	

== Triple J Hottest 100 ==
The annual music poll Triple J Hottest 100 was inaugurated in 1989 and is based on the public votes by listeners of Australian youth radio station Triple J. Billboard's Lars Brandle reported in January 2015 that "the state-funded Triple J network announced more than 2.099 million votes were cast by 258,762 listeners for this year's poll, a new record for an event now in its 22nd year." Wolfmother have scored eleven songs in the annual Hottest 100. Six songs by Wolfmother entered the listing in 2005, which at the time was the highest number of entries in a single Hottest 100 chart for an Australian artist. Also that year, Wolfmother's self-titled debut album was listed as the top album of the year. In 2011, the album was named one of the Triple J Hottest 100 Australian Albums of All Time.

Year	Work	Position	Ref.
2004	"Woman"	45	
2005	"Mind's Eye"	6	
2005	"Joker & the Thief"	9	
2005	"Apple Tree"	16	
2005	"Dimension"	37	
2005	"Colossal"	39	
2005	"White Unicorn"	84	
2005	Wolfmother	1	
2006	"Woman" (MSTRKRFT remix)	55	
2006	"Love Train"	80	
2007	"Pleased to Meet You"	83	
2009	"New Moon Rising"	75	
2011	Wolfmother	8	

== Other awards and nominations ==
The annual J Award, for the Australian Album of the Year, is presented by Triple J, which is determined by the station's musical director, Richard Kingsmill. In 2005 Wolfmother became the inaugural winners from their one nomination. The annual Channel [V] Awards are presented by Channel [V] Australia. The annual Jack Awards were presented in Australia from 2004 to 2007 and were sponsored by Jack Daniel's, an American Tennessee whiskey company. Wolfmother have received one award from two nominations. The BRIT Awards are presented by the British Phonographic Industry, first in 1977, and then annually from 1982. By 2001 they were voted for by over 1,000 people including: BPI member companies, DJs, music press, TV presenters, music industry members, lawyers, accountants, promoters and NUS entertainment officers. Wolfmother have received one nomination. The annual Canadian Indie Music Awards are presented during Canadian Music Week, which has been held since 1981 with "winners determined by a combination of fan and industry voting." Wolfmother have been nominated for one category. The annual Grammy Awards are presented by the National Academy of Recording Arts and Sciences, with winners decided by ballots of voting members. Wolfmother have received one award from one nomination.

Year	Recipient / Nominated work	Award	Result	Ref.
2005	Wolfmother	J Award – Best Australian Album	Won	
2006	Wolfmother	Channel [V] Awards – Oz Artist of the Year	Won	
2006	Wolfmother	Jack Awards – Best Live Band	Nominated	
2006	Wolfmother	mtvU Woodie Awards - Left Field Woodie	Nominated	
2007	Wolfmother	BRIT Awards – International Breakthrough Act	Nominated	
2007	Wolfmother	Canadian Indie Music Awards – Favourite International Artist/Group or Duo	Nominated	
2007	"Woman"	Grammy Awards – Best Hard Rock Performance	Won	
2007	Wolfmother	Jack Awards – Best Live Band	Won	
2010	Cosmic Egg	Classic Rock – Album of the Year	Nominated	
