= Wolfmother discography =

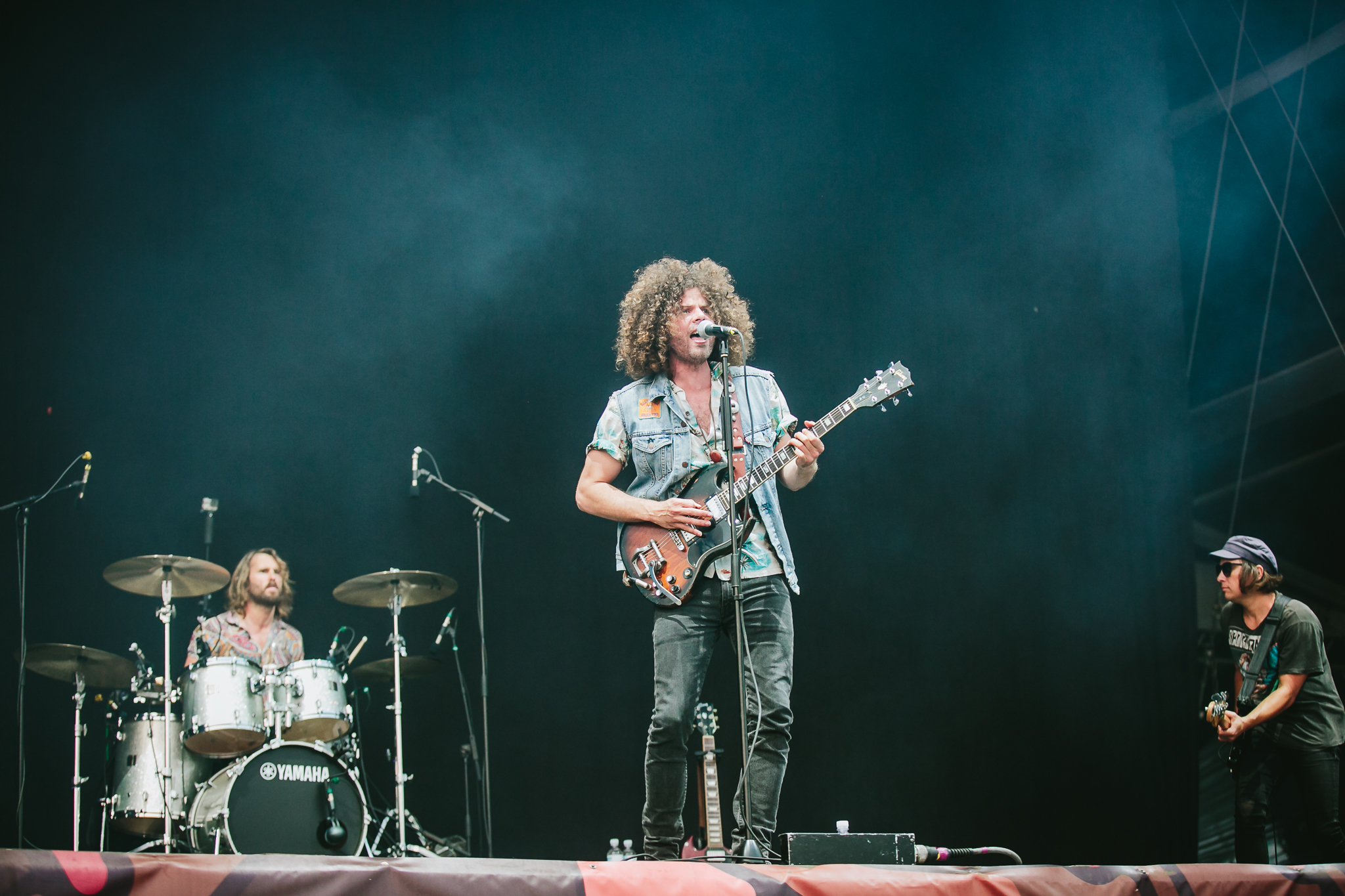
- Wolfmother performing live in 2018.
- Studio albums: 6
- Extended plays: 4
- Singles: 18
- Video albums: 1
- Music videos: 14
- Other appearances: 3

The discography of Australian hard rock band Wolfmother consists of six studio albums, four extended play (EPs), 18 singles, 14 music videos and one video album. The band have also contributed to two soundtracks and one tribute album. Originally from Sydney, Wolfmother were formed in 2004 by vocalist and guitarist Andrew Stockdale, bassist and keyboardist Chris Ross, and drummer Myles Heskett. After signing with Modular Recordings and releasing their self-titled debut EP in 2004, the band's debut full-length studio album, also titled Wolfmother, was released in Australia in October 2005. It reached number 3 on the Australian Albums Chart. The album was released internationally the following year, reaching number 25 in the UK, number 22 in the US, and selling over 1.6 million copies worldwide by 2009.

The band released their first live video Please Experience Wolfmother Live in August 2007, which reached number 7 on the Australian Music Video Chart. In August 2008, Ross and Heskett left the band due to "irreconcilable personal and musical differences". Stockdale and Wolfmother resurfaced early the next year with a new lineup including bassist and keyboardist Ian Peres, rhythm guitarist Aidan Nemeth and drummer Dave Atkins. The follow-up to Wolfmother, Cosmic Egg, was released in October 2009, again reaching number 3 in Australia. It also reached the top 20 on the US Billboard 200, the Canadian Albums Chart, and other regional charts. The lead single from the album, "New Moon Rising", reached number 50 on the Australian Singles Chart and number 33 on the US Billboard Mainstream Rock chart.

After more lineup changes, Stockdale stopped using the Wolfmother name in 2013 and released a collection of recent recordings under his own name as Keep Moving. The band returned shortly after the album's release, however, and later released their third album New Crown in March 2014, which reached number 160 on the Billboard 200. The band issued their fourth studio album Victorious in February 2016, which reached number 17 on the Australian Albums Chart, number 25 on the UK Albums Chart, and number 71 on the US Billboard 200. Lead single "Victorious" peaked at number 26 on the Billboard Mainstream Rock chart. In 2017 the band released a music video for new song "Special Lady", and later the single "Freedom Is Mine", which were followed by "Happy Wolfmothers Day" in May 2018.

== Studio albums ==
List of studio albums, with selected chart positions, sales figures and certifications
Title	Details	Peak chart positions										Sales	Certifications
Title	Details	AUS	AUT	CAN	FIN	GER	NED	SCO	SWI	UK	US	Sales	Certifications
Wolfmother	Released: 31 October 2005; Label: Modular; Formats: CD, LP	3	59	11	27	50	23	14	64	25	22	WW: 1,600,000 (Note: Worldwide sales for Wolfmother as of February 2016.); US: 590,000 (Note: United States sales for Wolfmother as of April 2013.)	ARIA: 5× Platinum; BPI: Gold; BVMI: Gold; MC: Gold; RIAA: Gold
Cosmic Egg	Released: 21 October 2009; Label: Modular; Formats: CD, LP, DL	3	11	12	32	11	14	33	26	35	16	US: 123,000 (Note: United States sales for Cosmic Egg as of April 2013.)	ARIA: Platinum
New Crown	Released: 23 March 2014; Label: Self-released; Formats: CD, LP, DL	—	—	—	—	—	—	—	—	—	160	US: 10,000 (Note: United States sales for New Crown as of January 2016.)	
Victorious	Released: 19 February 2016; Label: UMe; Formats: CD, LP, DL	17	9	33	34	9	20	16	5	25	71		
Rock'n'Roll Baby	Released: 29 December 2019; Label: DistroKid; Format: DL	—	—	—	—	—	—	—	—	—	—		
Rock Out	Released: 12 November 2021; Label: DistroKid; Format: DL	—	—	—	—	—	—	—	—	—	—		
"—" denotes a release that did not chart or was not issued in that region.

== Extended plays ==
List of extended plays, with selected chart positions
Title	Details	Peak
Title	Details	AUS
Wolfmother	Released: 27 September 2004; Label: Modular; Format: CD	35
Dimensions	Released: 31 January 2006; Label: Interscope; Format: CD+	—
Please Experience Wolfmother Live	Released: 24 August 2007; Label: Modular; Format: DL	—
iTunes Live from Sydney	Released: 30 March 2010; Label: Modular; Format: DL	—
"—" denotes a release that did not chart or was not issued in that region.

== Singles ==
List of singles, with selected chart positions and certifications
Title	Year	Peak chart positions										Certifications	Album
Title	Year	AUS	AUT	CAN Digi.	CAN Rock	POL	SCO	UK	UK Rock	US Bub.	US Main.	Certifications	Album
"Mind's Eye"	2005	29	—	—	—	—	88	142	—	—	—		Wolfmother
"White Unicorn"	2006	33	—	—	22	—	—	—	—	—	29		Wolfmother
"Dimension"	2006	—	—	—	—	—	38	49	1	—	—		Wolfmother
"Woman"	2006	34	—	—	3	—	19	31	2	12	7	BPI: Silver	Wolfmother
"Love Train"	2006	—	—	—	—	—	30	62	2	—	—		Wolfmother
"Joker & the Thief"	2006	8	—	61	10	—	31	64	—	—	27	ARIA: Gold; BPI: Gold	Wolfmother
"Back Round"	2009	100	—	—	—	—	—	—	—	—	—		Cosmic Egg
"New Moon Rising"	2009	50	73	—	16	44	—	—	—	—	33		Cosmic Egg
"White Feather"	2010	—	—	—	—	—	—	— (Note: "White Feather" did not enter the UK Singles Chart, but peaked at number 34 on the UK Physical Singles Chart Top 100.)	—	—	—		Cosmic Egg
"Far Away"	2010	—	—	—	—	—	—	—	—	—	—		Cosmic Egg
"Victorious"	2015	—	—	—	5	63	—	—	—	—	26		Victorious
"Freedom Is Mine"	2017	—	—	—	—	—	—	—	—	—	—		Rock'n'Roll Baby
"Happy Wolfmothers Day"	2018	—	—	—	—	—	—	—	—	—	—		Non-album single
"Higher"	2019	—	—	—	—	—	—	—	—	—	—		Rock'n'Roll Baby
"Chase the Feeling" (featuring Chris Cester)	2019	—	—	—	—	—	—	—	—	—	—		Non-album singles
"High on My Own Supply"	2020	—	—	—	—	—	—	—	—	—	—		Non-album singles
"Rock Out"	2021	—	—	—	—	—	—	—	—	—	—		Rock Out
"Midnight Train"	2021	—	—	—	—	—	—	—	—	—	—		Non-album singles
"Stay a Little Longer"	2023	—	—	—	—	—	—	—	—	—	—		Non-album singles
"—" denotes a release that did not chart or was not issued in that region.

== Videos ==
=== Video albums ===
List of video albums, with selected chart positions and certifications
Title	Album details	Peaks	Certifications
Title	Album details	AUS	Certifications
Please Experience Wolfmother Live	Released: 31 August 2007; Label: Modular; Format: DVD	7	ARIA: Platinum

=== Music videos ===
List of music videos, with directors
Title	Year	Director(s)	Ref.
"Mind's Eye"	2005	The Malloys	
"White Unicorn"	2006	Kris Moyes	
"Dimension"	2006	The Malloys	
"Woman"	2006	Alex and Martin	
"Love Train"	2006	Jay Martin	
"Joker & the Thief"	2006	The Malloys	
"New Moon Rising"	2009	Special Problems	
"White Feather"	2010	Snakes & Ladders	
"Far Away"	2010	Hydra	
"Heavy Weight"	2013	Dan Dobi	
"Victorious"	2016	Brother Willis	
"The Love That You Give"	2016	unknown	
"Special Lady"	2017	unknown	
"Chase the Feeling" (featuring Chris Cester)	2019	unknown	

== Other appearances ==
List of other song appearances
Title	Year	Album	Ref.
"Pleased to Meet You"	2007	Spider-Man 3	
"Fell Down a Hole"	2010	Almost Alice	
"Cheap Sunglasses"	2011	ZZ Top: A Tribute from Friends	
