= Please Experience Wolfmother Live =

Live album by Wolfmother

Video by Wolfmother
- Released: 31 August 2007
- Recorded: 20 July 2006 at the Hordern Pavilion, Sydney, New South Wales; 29 October 2006 at the Acer Arena, Sydney, New South Wales; and 15 November 2006 at the Brixton Academy, London, England
- Genres: Hard rock; heavy metal; neo-psychedelia; stoner rock
- Length: 110:06
- Label: Modular
- Director: The Malloys
- Producer: Rene Shalala

Please Experience Wolfmother Live

EP by Wolfmother
- Released: 24 August 2007
- Recorded: 20 July 2006 at the Hordern Pavilion, Sydney, New South Wales
- Length: 19:08
- Label: Modular

Wolfmother EP chronology
Dimensions (2006)	Please Experience Wolfmother Live (2007)	iTunes Live from Sydney (2010)

Please Experience Wolfmother Live is the debut video album by Australian hard rock band Wolfmother. Directed by The Malloys, who also directed a number of the band's music videos, the album features footage from three performances on Wolfmother's 2006 world tour in promotion of their 2005 self-titled debut album. It was first released in Australia on 31 August 2007 by Modular Recordings, and later followed in Europe on 10 September and finally in North America on 20 November.

The main feature of Please Experience Wolfmother Live is the band's full 12-song performance at the Hordern Pavilion in Sydney on 20 July 2006, which is introduced by Jackass stars Johnny Knoxville and Bam Margera. In addition to this, the album features "Joker & the Thief" at the ARIA Music Awards on 29 October 2006, "Dimension" and "Love Train" from a show at Brixton Academy in London, England on 15 November 2006, all five of the band's music videos at the time of release, and a short documentary.

One week prior to the video album, an extended play (EP) version of Please Experience Wolfmother Live was released, featuring three tracks and one video from the Hordern Pavilion show. The video was certified platinum by the Australian Recording Industry Association.

== Critical reception ==
Media response to Please Experience Wolfmother Live was mixed. Writing for The Sunday Times online publication PerthNow, Polly Coufos awarded the album three and a half stars out of five, proposing that "[Wolfmother's] brutal sound invokes the gods of metal past, with just enough tongue-in-cheek humour to keep outsiders interested too", praising "Joker & the Thief" as the highlight. A reviewer for the Manchester Evening News was more negative, however, claiming that "the performance [Wolfmother] have chosen to immortalise on [Please Experience Wolfmother Live] is not exactly their finest", criticising the "competent but bog-standard" camera work and editing, "uninteresting" stage set, and charisma-lacking performance.

== Track listing ==
All songs written and composed by Andrew Stockdale, Chris Ross and Myles Heskett.

=== Video album ===
Live at the Hordern, Sydney, Australia, 2006
No.	Title	Length
1.	"Dimension"	7:32
2.	"Pyramid"	4:34
3.	"Apple Tree"	3:47
4.	"White Unicorn"	10:44
5.	"Love Train"	3:13
6.	"Witchcraft"	4:40
7.	"Tales" (full title "Tales from the Forest of Gnomes")	4:19
8.	"Woman"	3:09
9.	"Mind's Eye"	11:47
10.	"Vagabond"	3:35
11.	"Colossal"	7:14
12.	"Joker & the Thief"	6:32
Total length:		71:04

Live at the ARIA Awards Ceremony, Sydney, Australia, 2006
No.	Title	Length
1.	"Joker & the Thief"	5:02
Total length:		5:02

Live at Brixton Academy, London, UK, 2006
No.	Title	Length
1.	"Dimension"	6:19
2.	"Love Train"	3:04
Total length:		9:23

Music videos
No.	Title	Length
1.	"Joker & the Thief"	4:15
2.	"White Unicorn"	4:28
3.	"Love Train"	3:05
4.	"Mind's Eye"	4:54
5.	"Woman"	2:31
Total length:		19:13

Meet the Mother
No.	Title	Length
1.	"An Introduction to the Band"	5:24
Total length:		5:24

=== Extended play ===
No.	Title	Length
1.	"Love Train"	2:57
2.	"Woman"	3:04
3.	"Mind's Eye"	6:00
4.	"Colossal" (video)	7:07
Total length:		19:08

== Personnel ==
Wolfmother

- Andrew Stockdale – vocals, guitar
- Chris Ross – bass, organ
- Myles Heskett – drums

Additional musicians

- Gustav Ejstes – flute ("Witchcraft")

Production personnel

- The Malloys – direction
- Rene Shalala – production
- John Watson – production
- Steve Pav – production
- Karen Tinman – production
- Archie Gormley – production

Additional personnel

- Jonathan Zawada – design
- Daniel Boud – photography
- Martin Philbey – photography
- John Stanton – photography
- Gary Wolstenholme – photography

== Charts ==
Chart (2007)	Peak position
Australian DVD Chart (ARIA Charts)	7

== Certifications ==
Region	Certification	Certified units/sales
Australia (ARIA)	Platinum	15,000^{^}
^{^} Shipments figures based on certification alone.
