= Dimensions (EP) =

EP by Wolfmother
- Released: 31 January 2006
- Recorded: 2005
- Studio: Sound City; Sunset Sound Factory; and The Pass, Hollywood, California, US
- Genre: Hard rock
- Length: 15:07
- Label: Modular
- Producer: Dave Sardy

Wolfmother chronology
Wolfmother (2005)	Dimensions (2006)	Please Experience Wolfmother Live (2007)

Professional ratings
Review scores
Source	Rating
AllMusic	2.5/5 stars

Dimensions is the second extended play (EP) by Australian rock band Wolfmother, released on 31 January 2006. It includes a total of four tracks and two music videos; three of the four songs were previously released on the band's self-titled album (one, "Love Train", only on the international version).

== Track listing ==
All songs were written by Andrew Stockdale, Chris Ross and Myles Heskett.

1. "Dimension" – 4:23
2. "Mind's Eye" – 4:57
3. "Love Train" – 3:02
4. "The Earth's Rotation Around the Sun" – 2:45
5. "Dimension" (music video) – 4:23
6. "Mind's Eye" (music video) – 4:57

== Credits ==
Wolfmother

- Andrew Stockdale – lead vocals, guitar
- Chris Ross – bass, keyboard
- Myles Heskett – drums

Additional personnel

- Dave Sardy – production
- Frank Frazetta – cover art
- Jonathan Zawada – layout design
