= High on My Own Supply =

2020 single by Wolfmother

Single by Wolfmother
- Released: 10 June 2020
- Recorded: 2019
- Genre: EDM; future bass
- Length: 3:49
- Songwriter: Andrew Stockdale

Wolfmother singles chronology
"Chase the Feeling" (2019)	"High on My Own Supply" (2020)	"Rock Out" (2021)

Music video
- "High on My Own Supply" on YouTube

"High on My Own Supply" is a 2020 single by Australian rock band, Wolfmother. The song was released on 10 June 2020 through Middle Man Records.

The song marked a drastic departure from the band's hard rock and psychedelic rock song, as the song embraced a more electronic dance music sound. Critically, the song was universally panned.

== Style ==
Unlike much of Wolfmother's previous work which has been described as neo-psychedelia, stoner rock, and hard rock, "High on My Own Supply" showcases an electronic-oriented sound. Josh Martin of, NME described it as an EDM-inspired track. Jason Heffler of EDM.com compared the song to MGMT, calling it a future bass song.

David Durán, of Mexican entertainment website Frecuencia Indigo, compared the track to the Chainsmokers, saying that Stockdale "explores a totally revamped sound in which synths and a more futuristic rhythmic base are imposed".

== Critical reception ==
Describing the overall fan reaction, Josh Martin of NME said the track's reaction "across social media from longtime fans of the band's nostalgic rock sound has been markedly negative".
