= Mind's Eye (song) =

Single by Wolfmother

from the album Wolfmother
- Released: 16 October 2005
- Genre: Hard rock; neo-psychedelia; progressive rock
- Length: 4:55
- Label: Modular
- Songwriters: Andrew Stockdale; Myles Heskett; Chris Ross
- Producer: Dave Sardy

Wolfmother singles chronology
"Mind's Eye" (2005)	"White Unicorn" (2006)

"Mind's Eye" is a song by Australian hard rock band Wolfmother. Written by band members Andrew Stockdale, Chris Ross and Myles Heskett, it was produced by Dave Sardy for the group's self-titled debut album in 2005. The song was also released as the first single from the album on 16 October 2005, initially as a double A-side with "Woman". The track reached number 29 on the Australian Singles Chart, number 88 on the Scottish Singles Chart and number 142 on the UK Singles Chart.

== Background ==
Two weeks prior to the domestic release of the band's self-titled debut album, "Mind's Eye" was released as Wolfmother's debut single in Australia on 16 October 2005. The Australian edition of the single was a double A-side release featuring fellow album track "Woman", with "The Earth's Rotation Around the Sun" featured as the B-side. The single debuted on the Australian Singles Chart at its peak position of number 29, remaining in the top 50 for four weeks running. It later re-entered the chart for a single week each in January and February 2006. Outside of Australia, "Mind's Eye" was issued as the band's first single on 9 January 2006, backed only with "The Earth's Rotation Around the Sun". It entered the UK Singles Chart at number 142, as well as the Scottish Singles Chart at number 88.

"Mind's Eye" is primarily categorised in the genres of hard rock, psychedelic rock and progressive rock. In a brief review of the single, The Irish Times compared the style of the song to progressive rock bands Yes, Camel, Rush, Emerson, Lake & Palmer and Premiata Forneria Marconi. In a feature for the retailer HMV, the song was compared to hard rock acts Led Zeppelin and Deep Purple, and progressive rock group Pink Floyd. Rolling Stone writer Brian Hiatt called the track a "psychedelic power ballad", while Chris Taylor of Gigwise identified it as an example of modern psychedelic rock. Dan Macintosh of music website PopMatters claimed that the band's "progressive rock vibe" was "especially apparent" when "Mind's Eye" was performed live, often with an extended keyboard and guitar solo.

The music video for "Mind's Eye" was directed by The Malloys, who would later collaborate with Wolfmother again on videos for "Dimension" and "Joker & the Thief". According to Steven Gottlieb of VideoStatic, it depicts the band "wandering around various outdoor settings". It was filmed at the Devil's Punchbowl in the Angeles National Forest, Los Angeles County, and is said to have been influenced stylistically by Pink Floyd: Live at Pompeii. The video was nominated for Best Rock Video at the MTV Australia Video Music Awards 2006 (the band were also nominated for Best Group and Spankin' New Aussie Artist), but lost out to "One Way Ticket" by The Darkness. The "Mind's Eye" video was later featured on the 2006 EP Dimensions and the 2007 video Please Experience Wolfmother Live.

== Reception ==
In reviews of Wolfmother, some critics praised "Mind's Eye" as one of the album's highlights. Writing for the website PopMatters, Adrian Begrand described the song as "a terrific epic ballad in the grand tradition of '70s arena rock", claiming that it "impeccably pulls off that quiet-loud-quite-loud formula perfected by the Scorpions, Judas Priest, and Rainbow 30 years ago". Similarly, James Jam of the NME described it as the "standout tune" on the album, while Blabbermouth.net's Keith Bergman suggested that it "merits" the band's comparisons to Led Zeppelin. Michael Dwyer of the Sydney Morning Herald praised the song's "howling and crashing chorus cadence". On the other hand, E! Online criticised "Mind's Eye" as a "jokey cut", while other reviewers mocked the presence of the keyboard solo.

"Mind's Eye" was recognised by several Australian music bodies. At the end of 2005, radio station Triple J included the song at number 6 on its Hottest 100 list, with five other tracks from the album also featured: "Joker & the Thief" at number 9, "Apple Tree" at number 16, "Dimension" at number 37, "Colossal" at number 39 and "White Unicorn" at number 84. The track was also nominated for Single of the Year at the ARIA Music Awards 2006, where Wolfmother won the awards for Best Group, Best Rock Album, Breakthrough Artist – Album; however, it lost out to "Black Fingernails, Red Wine" by Eskimo Joe.

== Track listing ==
All tracks are written by Andrew Stockdale, Chris Ross and Myles Heskett.

7" vinyl
No.	Title	Length
1.	"Mind's Eye"	4:55
2.	"The Earth's Rotation Around the Sun"	2:46
Total length:		7:41

Double A-side CD single
No.	Title	Length
1.	"Mind's Eye"	4:55
2.	"Woman"	2:57
3.	"The Earth's Rotation Around the Sun"	2:46
Total length:		10:38

Promo CD single
No.	Title	Length
1.	"Mind's Eye" (edit)	4:01
2.	"Mind's Eye" (original)	4:56
Total length:		8:57

== Personnel ==
- Andrew Stockdale – vocals, guitar
- Chris Ross – bass, keyboards
- Myles Heskett – drums
- Dave Sardy – production, mixing
- Ryan Castle – engineering
- Cameron Barton – engineering assistance
- Pete Martinez – engineering assistance
- Andy Brohard – Pro Tools editing
- Bernie Grundman – mastering
- Frank Frazetta – illustration

== Chart positions ==
Chart (2005)	Peak position
Australian Singles (ARIA)	29
Chart (2006)	Peak position
Scottish Singles (OCC)	88
UK Singles (OCC)	142
