= White Unicorn =

Single by Wolfmother

from the album Wolfmother
- Released: 26 February 2006
- Genre: Hard rock; neo-psychedelia
- Length: 5:04
- Label: Modular
- Songwriters: Andrew Stockdale; Myles Heskett; Chris Ross
- Producer: Dave Sardy

Wolfmother singles chronology
"Mind's Eye" (2005)	"White Unicorn" (2006)	"Dimension" (2006)

"White Unicorn" is a song by Australian hard rock band Wolfmother. Written by band members Andrew Stockdale, Chris Ross and Myles Heskett, it was produced by Dave Sardy for the group's self-titled debut album in 2005. The song was also released as the second single from the album in Australia on 26 February 2006. The track reached number 33 on the Australian Singles Chart and 29 on the US Billboard Mainstream Rock chart.

== Background ==
"White Unicorn" was one of four songs originally recorded by Wolfmother for the band's self-titled debut EP in 2004, initially under "The White Unicorn". It was later re-recorded for the group's self-titled full-length debut the following year and released as the second single from the album on 26 February 2006. The song was backed with "Love Train" and music videos for "Dimension" and "Mind's Eye", all of which had been recently released on the EP Dimensions. The single debuted on the Australian Singles Chart at its peak position of number 33, remaining in the top 50 for three weeks running. Outside of Australia, it was the band's first track to register on the US Billboard Mainstream Rock chart, debuting at number 37, before spending 12 weeks on the chart and peaking at number 29.

Stylistically, "White Unicorn" has been compared to the work of Led Zeppelin by multiple commentators. Adam Webb of Dotmusic claimed that the song "forges its classic axe signature into a Led Zeppelin stomper". In contrast, Pitchfork's Cory D. Byrom claimed that "Its opening bars recall Led Zeppelin's gentler side with clean-strummed guitar chords and Stockdale putting on his best Robert Plant". Writers for Rolling Stone and People magazines compared the song's guitar riffs to the work of Zeppelin's Jimmy Page. Sam Shepherd of musicOMH went as far as to claim that the song uses the opening chords to Led Zeppelin's "Ramble On" in its main riff. In a review for Blabbermouth.net, Keith Bergman likened the instrumental breakdown in the middle of the song to The Doors track "Riders on the Storm".

The music video for "White Unicorn" comprises footage from Wolfmother's performances at Big Day Out and Homebake festivals in 2005, edited by Kris Moyes. According to Steven Gottlieb of VideoStatic, "Most of the camera angles emanate from behind the band to convey just how big these guys are down under, while various color effects give the clip a slight psychedelic feel". Speaking about the lack of a director credit on the video, Moyes claims that "Since I was asked to do this as a favour I decided not to have a producer/director credit". Shortly after the original video's release, a "defaced version" featuring various overlaid sketches was released. The defacing was originally credited to "Bandito Bruce", a 16-year-old Wolfmother fan "with no connection to the band or label". However, Moyes later revealed that he himself had produced the version, noting that he was inspired by the work L.H.O.O.Q., a defaced reproduction of the Mona Lisa by artist Marcel Duchamp.

== Reception ==
In reviews of Wolfmother, some critics praised "White Unicorn" as one of the album's highlights. Writing for the website PopMatters, Adrian Begrand claimed that it "emerges as the clear winner on the entire disc, neatly marrying the hippy-dippy sentiment of Robert Plant and the monstrous chords of Tony Iommi before briefly returning to the acid rock sounds of Hawkwind again". Adam Webb of Dotmusic highlighted the song as the prime example of the band's songwriting ability. At the same time,The Observer columnist Ben Thompson recommended it as one of two (alongside "Pyramid") highlights of the record. At the end of 2005, Australian radio station Triple J included "White Unicorn" at number 84 on its Hottest 100 list, the lowest position of the six Wolfmother tracks featured.

== Track listing ==
All tracks are written by Andrew Stockdale, Chris Ross and Myles Heskett.

CD maxi single
No.	Title	Length
1.	"White Unicorn"	5:04
2.	"Love Train"	3:00
3.	"Dimension" (music video)	4:23
4.	"Mind's Eye" (music video)	4:54
Total length:		17:21

Promo CD single
No.	Title	Length
1.	"White Unicorn" (radio edit)	3:19
2.	"White Unicorn" (album version)	5:04
Total length:		8:23

== Personnel ==
- Andrew Stockdale – vocals, guitar
- Chris Ross – bass, keyboards
- Myles Heskett – drums
- Dave Sardy – production, mixing
- Ryan Castle – engineering
- Cameron Barton – engineering assistance
- Pete Martinez – engineering assistance
- Andy Brohard – Pro Tools editing
- Bernie Grundman – mastering
- Frank Frazetta – illustration

== Chart positions ==
Chart (2006)	Peak position
Australian Singles (ARIA)	33
Chart (2007)	Peak position
Canada Rock (Billboard)	22
US Mainstream Rock Songs (Billboard)	29
