= Wolfmother (EP) =

2004 EP by Wolfmother

EP by Wolfmother
- Released: 27 September 2004
- Recorded: 2004
- Studio: Ghetto (Detroit, Michigan)
- Genre: Heavy metal; hard rock; neo-psychedelia; stoner rock
- Length: 18:06
- Label: Modular
- Producer: Jim Diamond

Wolfmother chronology
Wolfmother (2004)	Wolfmother (2005)

Wolfmother is the debut extended play (EP) by Australian rock band Wolfmother. Recorded and mixed at Ghetto Studios in Detroit, it was released in Australia on 27 September 2004 and later in the United States and the United Kingdom. The EP was produced and mastered by Jim Diamond and mixed by bassist and keyboardist Chris Ross; the album cover was designed by drummer Myles Heskett. All four songs from Wolfmother were later re-recorded for the band's self-titled debut studio album; "Dimension", "Woman" and "White Unicorn" were also released as singles from the album.

== Reception ==
Professional ratings
Review scores
Source	Rating
AllMusic	2.5/5 stars

The release of the Wolfmother EP began the consequently commonplace comparisons between the band and 1960s and 1970s rock artists, namely Black Sabbath. In a review for music website AllMusic, critic Eduardo Rivadavia summarised the record by saying "Wolfmother aren't claiming any measure of originality here -- they're just offering a form of time travel." He also said the following in his review:

Powerfully fuzzy guitar riffs, serpentine basslines, thumping percussion, echoed, warbling vocals, and even the occasional Hammond organ provide the fundamental building blocks for the youthful trio's convincingly Jurassic creations; and the impressive opening tandem of "Dimension" [...] and "Woman" carry off the illusion so authentically [...]. Next number "Apple Tree" diverges from the basic template just a tad by interspersing a jolt of psychedelic garage rock into its otherwise familiarly ponderous sections [...] and the grand finale intended by "The White Unicorn" is largely achieved thanks to surprisingly pretty, chiming guitar melodies à la Led Zeppelin.

Wolfmother's debut release was also a minor commercial success, reaching number 35 on the Australian ARIA Singles Chart.

== Track listing ==
All songs were written by Andrew Stockdale, Chris Ross and Myles Heskett.

1. "Dimension" – 4:07
2. "Woman" – 2:43
3. "Apple Tree" – 3:32
4. "White Unicorn" – 7:44

== Personnel ==
Wolfmother

- Andrew Stockdale – vocals, guitar
- Chris Ross – bass guitar, keyboards, mixing
- Myles Heskett – drums, artwork

Additional personnel

- Jim Diamond – production, mastering

== Charts ==
Chart (2004)	Peak position
Australia (ARIA)	35
