= Dimension (song) =

Single by Wolfmother

from the album Wolfmother
- Released: 17 April 2006
- Genre: Hard rock
- Length: 4:23
- Label: Modular
- Songwriter(s): Andrew Stockdale; Myles Heskett; Chris Ross
- Producer(s): Dave Sardy

Wolfmother singles chronology
"White Unicorn" (2006)	"Dimension" (2006)	"Woman" (2006)

"Dimension" is a song by Australian hard rock band Wolfmother. Written by band members Andrew Stockdale, Chris Ross, and Myles Heskett, it was produced by Dave Sardy for the group's self-titled debut album in 2005. The song was also released as the third single from the album on 17 April 2006, and as the lead track on the EP Dimensions. The song reached number 38 on the Scottish Singles Chart, number 49 on the UK Singles Chart and number 1 on the UK Rock & Metal Singles Chart.

== Background ==
"Dimension" was one of four songs originally recorded by Wolfmother for their self-titled debut EP in 2004. It was later re-recorded for the group's self-titled full-length debut the following year and featured on the EP Dimensions in January 2006, their first material released in the United States. On 17 April 2006, one week prior to the European release of Wolfmother, "Dimension" was released in Europe as the band's third single. The song was backed with "The Earth's Rotation Around the Sun" and previous single "Mind's Eye". The single debuted on the UK Singles Chart at its peak position of number 49, remaining in the top 100 for three weeks running. It also registered at number 39 on the Scottish Singles Chart, and was the band's first single to top the UK Rock & Metal Singles Chart.

Several commentators compared the style of "Dimension" to the music of Black Sabbath and Led Zeppelin. Reviewing the Dimensions EP for AllMusic, Thom Jurek outlined that the song contains "Over stomping, fuzz-thudding Geezer Butler-style bass", as well as comparing Andrew Stockdale's vocals to those of Sabbath and Zeppelin frontmen Ozzy Osbourne and Robert Plant. Drowned in Sound writer Jordan Dowling claimed that "several nods" are given to Sabbath guitarist Tony Iommi on the track, Kerry McGregor of the fanzine Burnout identified a "Black Sabbath-esque stomp", and Blabbermouth.net's Keith Bergman suggested that it features "some early Ozzy warbling". Sam Shepherd of musicOMH claimed that the song "shamelessly bridges the gap between Black Sabbath and Zeppelin".

The music video for "Dimension" was directed by The Malloys, who had previously collaborated with the band on the video for "Mind's Eye", and would later return to direct "Joker & the Thief". Steven Gottlieb of VideoStatic described it as a "no-frills video" which "uses a mix of grainy [black and white] and color film to capture an outdoor performance". The "Dimension" video was originally released on the Dimensions EP. It was later distributed commercially in February, with music video channels including MTV and Fuse airing it from March. Later, it was featured on 2007's Please Experience Wolfmother Live.

== Reception ==
"Dimension" received a mixed reception from critics. Reviewing the single for Drowned in Sound, Jordan Dowling called it "a mammoth of a track" and a "high-octane rocker", claiming that it "sounds fresher than the majority of its genre-crossing, boundary pushing competitors". In a review of Wolfmother for the NME, James Jam suggested that the song "tick[s] the requisite boxes for all great rock'n'roll – raucous, righteous and totally, thrillingly dumb". PopMatters writer Adrian Begrand outlined that the track "sounds like uninspired garage rock at first, but quickly kicks into gear a grooving riff, and then downshifts into an ear-splitting breakdown". AllMusic's Thom Jurek, however, was damning of "Dimension", criticising it as "mucky, dirty, and saturated in the very 'eavy rock clichés of yore", and calling the song's lyrics "just plain bad".

== Track listing ==
All tracks are written by Andrew Stockdale, Chris Ross and Myles Heskett

United Kingdom 7" vinyl
No.	Title	Length
1.	"Dimension"	4:23
Total length:		4:23

European CD single
No.	Title	Length
1.	"Dimension"	4:23
2.	"The Earth's Rotation Around the Sun"	2:47
3.	"Mind's Eye"	4:55
Total length:		12:05

United Kingdom CD single
No.	Title	Length
1.	"Dimension"	4:23
2.	"The Earth's Rotation Around the Sun"	2:47
Total length:		7:10

== Personnel ==
- Andrew Stockdale – vocals, guitar
- Chris Ross – bass, keyboards
- Myles Heskett – drums, tambourine
- Dave Sardy – production, mixing
- Ryan Castle – engineering
- Cameron Barton – engineering assistance
- Pete Martinez – engineering assistance
- Andy Brohard – Pro Tools editing
- Bernie Grundman – mastering
- Frank Frazetta – illustration

== Chart positions ==
Chart (2006)	Peak position
Scottish Singles (OCC)	38
UK Singles (OCC)	49
UK Rock & Metal Singles (OCC)	1
