= Woman (Wolfmother song) =

Single by Wolfmother

from the album Wolfmother
- Released: 17 June 2006
- Studio: The Sound Factory, Hollywood, California
- Length: 2:56
- Label: Modular
- Songwriters: Andrew Stockdale; Chris Ross; Myles Heskett
- Producer: Dave Sardy

Wolfmother singles chronology
"Dimension" (2006)	"Woman" (2006)	"Love Train" (2006)

Music video
- "Woman" on Vimeo

"Woman" is a song by Australian rock band Wolfmother. Originally released in 2004 from their debut EP Wolfmother, it was released in 2006 as the fourth single from their debut studio album Wolfmother.

In Australia, the original recording of the song was ranked number 45 on Triple J's Hottest 100 of 2004.

The song peaked at number 7 on the Billboard Mainstream Rock Tracks chart and number 10 on the Modern Rock Tracks chart.

In 2007, it won the award for Best Hard Rock Performance at the 49th Annual Grammy Awards.

== Content ==
Singer Andrew Stockdale said the song was inspired both by his girlfriend, and the overall impression of living in Sydney, "this beautiful city in the harbor."

== Track listings ==
All songs written by Andrew Stockdale, Chris Ross and Myles Heskett.

Australian CD

1. "Woman"
2. "Woman" (MSTRKRFT remix)
3. "Woman" (Avalanches remix)
4. "Dimension" (live at Big Day Out)

Australian 7" vinyl

1. "Woman
2. "Colossal" (live at Big Day Out)

United Kingdom CD

1. "Woman"
2. "Dimension" (live at Big Day Out)
3. "Vagabond" (acoustic version)
4. "Woman" (music video)

United Kingdom 7" vinyl

1. "Woman"
2. "Woman" (Avalanches remix)

United Kingdom 12" picture disc

1. "Woman"
2. "Woman" (MSTRKRFT remix)

== Charts ==
=== Weekly charts ===
Weekly chart performance for "Woman"
Chart (2006)	Peak position
Australia (ARIA)	34
Canada Rock Top 30 (Radio & Records)	3
Scottish Singles Sales (Official Charts)	19
UK Singles (Official Charts)	31
UK Rock & Metal (Official Charts)	2
US Bubbling Under Hot 100 (Billboard)	12
US Alternative Airplay (Billboard)	10
US Mainstream Rock Airplay (Billboard)	7

=== Year-end charts ===
Year-end chart performance for "Woman"
Chart (2006)	Position
Canada Rock (Radio & Records)	6
US Alternative Songs (Billboard)	36
US Mainstream Rock Songs (Billboard)	30

== Certifications ==
Certifications for "Woman"
Region	Certification	Certified units/sales
United Kingdom (BPI)	Silver	200,000^{‡}
^{‡} Sales+streaming figures based on certification alone.

== APRA Award ==
- 2008 Most Played Australian Work Overseas APRA Award for "Woman", written by Stockdale, Ross and Heskett, was presented by Australasian Performing Right Association.

== In popular culture ==
"Woman" was featured in the soundtracks of 2006 video games Major League Baseball 2K7, MotorStorm, Madden NFL 07, Tony Hawk's Project 8, and Pure, as well as a remix in Juiced 2: Hot Import Nights in 2007. It is a playable song in Guitar Hero II and in Guitar Hero Smash Hits. It was featured in the 2008 video game Saints Row 2 as a track in one of its in-game radio stations.
