= Wolfmother (album) =

2005 studio album by Wolfmother

Studio album by Wolfmother
- Released: 31 October 2005
- Recorded: June–September 2005
- Studios: Sound City Studios, Los Angeles, California
- Genres: Hard rock; stoner rock; heavy metal; psychedelic rock; neo-psychedelia
- Length: 51:17 (Australian version); 54:27 (International version)
- Labels: Modular; Interscope
- Producer: Dave Sardy

Wolfmother chronology
Wolfmother EP (2004)	Wolfmother (2005)	Dimensions EP (2006)

Singles from Wolfmother
- 1. "Mind's Eye" Released: 16 October 2005; 2. "White Unicorn" Released: 26 February 2006; 3. "Dimension" Released: 17 April 2006; 4. "Woman" Released: 17 June 2006; 5. "Love Train" Released: 18 September 2006; 6. "Joker & the Thief" Released: 28 October 2006

Wolfmother is the debut studio album by Australian rock band Wolfmother, originally released on 31 October 2005 in Australia through Modular Recordings. The album was later released internationally at various dates in 2006 through Interscope Records, with the addition of "Love Train" and a rearranged track listing. Wolfmother peaked at number three on the Australian ARIA Albums Chart and was certified five times platinum by the Australian Recording Industry Association. Six singles were released from Wolfmother's debut album: "Mind's Eye" (with "Woman"), "White Unicorn", "Dimension", "Woman", "Love Train" and "Joker & the Thief", the latter of which charted the highest at number eight on the ARIA Singles Chart. The album cover, which is taken from The Sea Witch by Frank Frazetta, shows a nymph standing against a blue/orange sky, on a rock, though because it displays nudity the album was sold in Wal-Mart stores with an alternate cover featuring the band's white logo against a black background. It is the only album to feature co-founding members Chris Ross and Myles Heskett, who left the band in August 2008.

At the J Award of 2005, the album won Australian Album of the Year.

== Release and reception ==
Professional ratings
Aggregate scores
Source	Rating
Metacritic	76/100
Review scores
Source	Rating
AllMusic	link
Blender	4/5 stars
NME	(7/10)
Pitchfork	(7.5/10)
Rolling Stone	(favorable)

Wolfmother was first issued in Australia on 30 October 2005 through Modular Recordings. Prior to its release it was played on high rotation on radio station Triple J, and as a result was the featured album of the week starting 28 October, won both the inaugural J Award and the listener's choice Album of the Year. It also contributed a record total of six songs to the Hottest 100 chart, of which the highest was "Mind's Eye" at No. 6. By 2007, the album had been certified five times platinum and had peaked at No. 3.

For the international release of the album, the track listing was tweaked slightly and "Love Train", previously released as the B-side to "White Unicorn", was added. It was not as well received in the UK and the US as in Australia, though Wolfmother still managed to reach No. 25 and No. 22 respectively. By 2007 it had also been certified gold by the British Phonographic Industry, the Recording Industry Association of America and the Canadian Recording Industry Association.

Upon its release, Wolfmother received mainly positive reviews from critics. It was named 15th greatest album of 2006 by Rolling Stone magazine. The album's sound was compared to such 1960s and 1970s hard rock and heavy metal bands as Led Zeppelin and Black Sabbath, as well as more modern bands including Queens of the Stone Age and The White Stripes, though this led some reviewers to go as far as accusing the trio of "ripping off" such bands. Q were somewhat less critical, describing the music as "Far from rocket science, but immense fun nonetheless". Total Guitar gave the album 9/10, describing it as "ruddy marvellous", adding that it "can't fail to bowl you over". The Record Review also praised the band and its debut, remarking that if they "continue to produce such epic songs and memorable riffs, there’s no doubt they will be at the forefront of rock and roll for years to come."

Following the release of the debut, Yahoo! critic Rob O'Connor noted them as number 15 on his list of 'The Greatest Australian Acts' on his 'List of the Day' blog. Furthermore, he compared their sound to be more reminiscent of psychedelic rock bands like Blue Cheer, Toe Fat Revival, Bloodrock and Frijid Pink, rather than comparing them to straight forward hard rock bands like Black Sabbath. Lars Ulrich of Metallica fame has gone on record as a huge fan of the debut, noting their debut to be "awesome", and that following its release, he would listen to it "every day".

The album has sold over 1.6 million copies worldwide.

== Track listings ==
All songs written and composed by Andrew Stockdale, Chris Ross, and Myles Heskett.

=== Original Australian version ===
No.	Title	Length
1.	"Colossal"	5:02
2.	"Woman"	2:55
3.	"White Unicorn"	5:01
4.	"Pyramid"	4:28
5.	"Mind's Eye"	4:53
6.	"Joker & the Thief"	4:39
7.	"Dimension"	4:25
8.	"Where Eagles Have Been"	5:32
9.	"Apple Tree"	3:28
10.	"Tales from the Forest of Gnomes"	3:35
11.	"Witchcraft"	3:25
12.	"Vagabond"	3:47

=== International version ===
No.	Title	Length
1.	"Dimension"	4:21
2.	"White Unicorn"	5:04
3.	"Woman"	2:56
4.	"Where Eagles Have Been"	5:33
5.	"Apple Tree"	3:30
6.	"Joker & the Thief"	4:40
7.	"Colossal"	5:04
8.	"Mind's Eye"	4:54
9.	"Pyramid"	4:28
10.	"Witchcraft"	3:25
11.	"Tales"	3:39
12.	"Love Train"	3:03
13.	"Vagabond"	3:50

=== United States 14-track edition ===
No.	Title	Length
14.	"Colossal" (Live at the Big Day Out)	5:52

=== United States 15-track edition ===
No.	Title	Length
14.	"Woman" (MSTRKRFT remix)	3:28
15.	"Love Train" (Chicken Lips remix)	5:44

=== 10th anniversary deluxe edition ===
Bonus B-Sides
No.	Title	Length
14.	"The Earth's Rotation Around the Sun"	2:48
15.	"Vagabond" (Acoustic Version)	2:41
16.	"Joker & the Thief" (Loving Hands Remix)	9:19
17.	"Woman" (MSTRKRFT Remix)	3:31
18.	"Love Train" (Chicken Lips Malfunction Remix)	5:46

Disc 2: Demos, B-sides & Live Tracks
No.	Title	Length
1.	"Dimension" (Demo)	4:17
2.	"White Unicorn" (Demo)	8:16
3.	"Woman" (Early Days Demo)	2:18
4.	"Apple Tree" (Demo)	3:27
5.	"Not Goin' Home" ("Joker & the Thief" Demo)	4:46
6.	"Colossal" (Demo)	5:26
7.	"Pyramid" (Early Jam Demo)	4:51
8.	"Witchcraft" (Rehearsal Room Demo)	4:02
9.	"Love Train" (Rehearsal Room Demo)	2:37
10.	"Vagabond" (Rehearsal Room Demo)	3:10
11.	"Woman" (Live)	4:16
12.	"Tales from the Forest of Gnomes" (Live)	3:49
13.	"Mind's Eye" (Live)	5:54
14.	"Dimension" (Live)	6:15
15.	"Where Eagles Have Been" (Live)	6:05

== Personnel ==
Wolfmother

- Andrew Stockdale – vocals, guitar
- Chris Ross – bass, keyboards
- Myles Heskett – drums

Guest musicians

- Lenny Castro – percussion on "Apple Tree", "Witchcraft" and "Love Train"
- Dan Higgins – flute on "Witchcraft"

Additional personnel

- Dave Sardy – production, mixing, percussion on "Colossal", "Where Eagles Have Been", "Vagabond" and "Love Train"
- Ryan Castle – engineering
- Stephen Marcussen – mastering
- Andy Brohard – digital editing, assistant engineering, Pro Tools editing
- Cameron Barton – assistant engineering
- Pete Martinez – assistant engineering
- Frank Frazetta – cover painting

== Charts ==
=== Weekly charts ===
Chart (2005–2006)	Peak position
Australian Albums (ARIA)	3
Austrian Albums (Ö3 Austria)	59
Belgian Albums (Ultratop Flanders)	58
Canadian Albums (Billboard)	11
Danish Albums (Hitlisten)	33
Dutch Albums (Album Top 100)	23
Finnish Albums (Suomen virallinen lista)	27
French Albums (SNEP)	149
German Albums (Offizielle Top 100)	50
Irish Albums (IRMA)	68
Japanese Albums (Oricon)	65
Norwegian Albums (VG-lista)	8
Scottish Albums (Official Charts)	14
Swedish Albums (Sverigetopplistan)	27
Swiss Albums (Schweizer Hitparade)	64
UK Albums (Official Charts)	25
UK Rock & Metal Albums (Official Charts)	2
US Billboard 200	22
US Indie Store Album Sales (Billboard)	5
US Top Rock Albums (Billboard)	10

=== Decade-end charts ===
Chart (2000–2009)	Position
Australian Albums (ARIA)	39

== Certifications ==
Region	Certification	Certified units/sales
Australia (ARIA)	5× Platinum	350,000^{^}
Canada (Music Canada)	Gold	50,000^{^}
Germany (BVMI)	Gold	100,000^{‡}
New Zealand (RMNZ)	Platinum	15,000^{‡}
United Kingdom (BPI)	Gold	100,000^{^}
United States (RIAA)	Gold	500,000^{^}
^{^} Shipments figures based on certification alone.^{‡} Sales+streaming figures based on certification alone.

== Release history ==
Region	Date	Label	Format	Catalog	Ref.
Australia	31 October 2005	Modular	Compact Disc	MODCD036	
United States (14-track version)	18 April 2006	Modular	Digital download	—	
Europe (13-track version)	24 April 2006	Island	Compact Disc	9877684	
United Kingdom (13-track version)	24 April 2006	Island	Double 12-inch vinyl	986 500–4	
North America (13-track version)	2 May 2006	Modular	Compact Disc	MODCD041	
Australia (13-track reissue)	3 June 2006	Modular	Compact Disc	MODCD043	
Japan (13-track version)	11 July 2006	Universal	Compact Disc	9051	
United States (15-track reissue)	2 January 2007	Modular	Digital download	—	
Japan (13-track version)	22 January 2007	Universal	Compact Disc and DVD	9054	
