= Joker & the Thief =

2005 single by Wolfmother

Single by Wolfmother

from the album Wolfmother
- B-side: "Where Eagles Have Been" (live)
- Released: 28 October 2006
- Studio: The Sound Factory (Hollywood, California)
- Genre: Hard rock
- Length: 4:40 (album version); 3:48 (radio edit with intro); 3:28 (radio edit)
- Label: Modular
- Songwriter: Wolfmother
- Producer: Dave Sardy

Wolfmother singles chronology
"Love Train" (2006)	"Joker & the Thief" (2006)	"Back Round" (2009)

Music video
- "Joker & the Thief" on Vimeo

"Joker & the Thief" (sometimes listed as "Joker and the Thief") is a song by Australian rock band Wolfmother. The song serves as the sixth track and sixth single from the band's first album Wolfmother. It was released in Australia on 28 October 2006 and in the United Kingdom on 20 November 2006. The music video for the song, featuring the cast of the film Jackass Number Two, was nominated for the "Best Rock Video" and "Video of the Year" awards at the 2007 MTV Australia Awards. The titular "joker" and "thief" are a reference to the lyrics of Bob Dylan's 1967 song "All Along the Watchtower".

In January 2018, as part of Triple M's "Ozzest 100", the 'most Australian' songs of all time, "Joker & the Thief" was ranked number 59, and placed 43 in the Triple J Hottest 100 of Australian Songs in 2025.

== Content ==
Singer Andrew Stockdale told an interviewer,

I was in a shop one morning walking into where we jam. I saw this AC/DC 'Thunderstruck.' And I was like, I want to write a stadium rock song. I went into the studio and said, 'Doo-duh-lee, doo-duh-lee.' What's the best thing to do after that? Just do something cleaner. 'Doo, doo, doo..' Because, you know, you've got to have a big intro and then you have to have a balls-to-the-wall riff to knock it on the head in the next stage. But yeah, that's it.

== Track listings ==
All songs are credited to Wolfmother.

Australian CD single

1. "Joker & the Thief"
2. "Joker & the Thief" (Loving Hand Remix)
3. "Vagabond" (Acoustic Version)
4. "Where Eagles Have Been" (Live at Lollapalooza)

UK CD single

1. "Joker & the Thief"
2. "Joker & the Thief" (Loving Hand Remix)
3. "Where Eagles Have Been" (Live at Lollapalooza)

UK DVD single

1. "Joker & the Thief" (Audio)
2. "Joker & the Thief" (Video)
3. "Dimension" (Live at The Scala)
4. "Jackass Number Two Trailer"

UK 7-inch vinyl

1. "Joker & the Thief"
2. "Where Eagles Have Been" (Live at Lollapalooza)

== Personnel ==
- Andrew Stockdale – guitar, vocals
- Chris Ross – bass, keyboard
- Myles Heskett – drums

== Charts ==
=== Weekly charts ===
Chart (2006)	Peak position
Australia (ARIA)	8
Canada Rock (Billboard)	10
Scottish Singles Sales (Official Charts)	31
UK Singles (Official Charts)	64
US Alternative Airplay (Billboard)	31
US Mainstream Rock Airplay (Billboard)	27

=== Year-end charts ===
Chart (2006)	Position
Australia (ARIA)	69

Chart (2007)	Position
Australia (ARIA)	77

== Certifications ==
Region	Certification	Certified units/sales
Australia (ARIA)	Gold	35,000^{^}
New Zealand (RMNZ)	2× Platinum	60,000^{‡}
United Kingdom (BPI)	Gold	400,000^{‡}
^{^} Shipments figures based on certification alone.^{‡} Sales+streaming figures based on certification alone.
