= Love Train (Wolfmother song) =

Single by Wolfmother

from the album Wolfmother
- B-side: "Woman" (live)
- Released: 18 September 2006
- Recorded: 2005 at Sound City Studios, Los Angeles, California, USA
- Genre: Hard rock, funk rock
- Length: 3:03
- Label: Island
- Songwriter: Wolfmother
- Producer: Dave Sardy

Wolfmother singles chronology
"Woman" (2006)	"Love Train" (2006)	"Joker & the Thief" (2006)

Music video
- "Love Train" on Vimeo

"Love Train" is a song by Australian hard rock band Wolfmother, featured on the 2006 international version of their debut studio album Wolfmother. "Love Train" was released as the fifth single from Wolfmother, on 7" picture disc, CD single and as a digital download, on 18 September 2006 by Island Records. It became a minor commercial success in the United Kingdom, reaching number 62 on the UK Singles Chart.

The music video for "Love Train" was directed by Jay Martin, who described it as a combination of "band portraits and epic, heroic performance". The CD single featured a live version of hit single "Woman" recorded at radio station Triple J, as well as the music video; a 12" picture disc version of the single was later released in 2007, featuring a number of remixes by English electronic band Chicken Lips.

"Love Train" was noted for being featured in an iPod advertisement. It was also featured in The Hangover Part II.

== Track listings ==
7" picture disc (1707876)

1. "Love Train" - 3:03

CD single (1707877)

1. "Love Train" - 3:03
2. "Woman" (live at Triple J) - 4:14
3. "Love Train" (music video)

12" picture disc (1723565)

1. "Love Train" (Chicken Lips malfunction vocal)
2. "Love Train" (Chicken Lips malfunction instrumental)
3. "Love Train" (Chicken Lips malfunction dub)
4. "Love Train" (original mix)
