= Chris Ross (musician) =

Australian musician

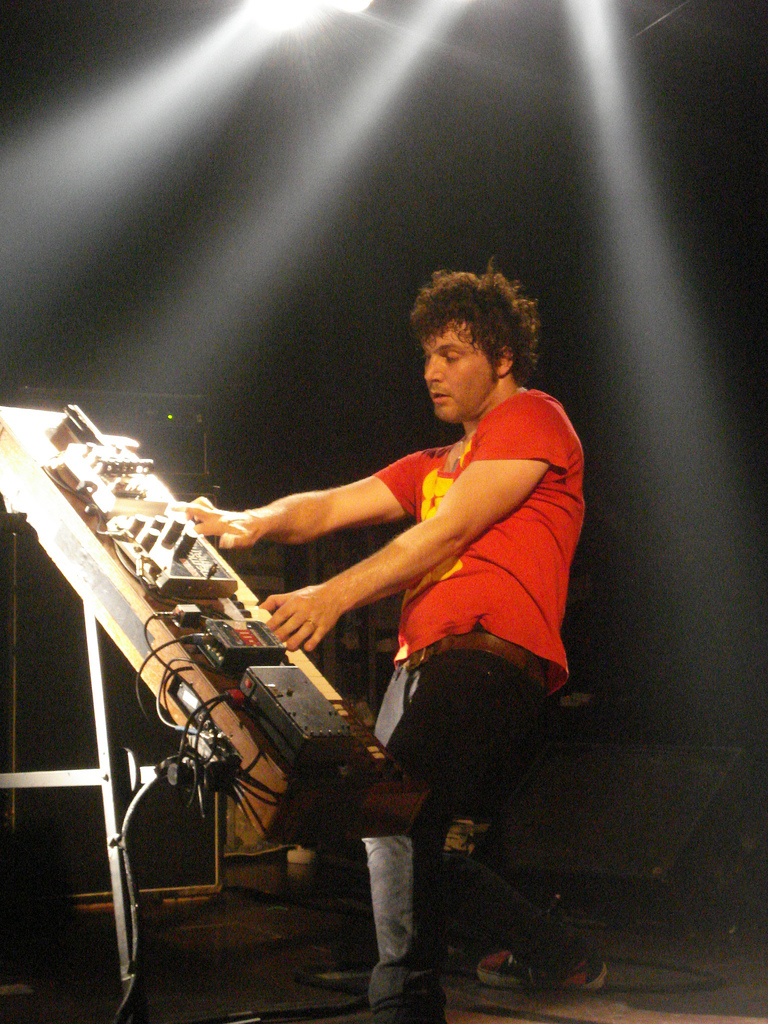
- Ross performing with Wolfmother in Lisbon, May 2007.

Background information
- Born: Christopher James Ross; Sydney, New South Wales, Australia
- Genres: Hard rock, electronic rock
- Occupations: Musician, songwriter
- Instruments: Bass guitar, keyboards
- Years active: 2000–present
- Labels: Modular, Interscope, Island
- Formerly of: Wolfmother; Doom Buggy; Palace of Fire; The Slew; Good Heavens

Christopher James Ross is an Australian musician. He was the founding bass guitarist and keyboardist of hard rock band, Wolfmother, from 2000 to August 2008. His trademark stage antic is playing the keyboard at a slant or vertically. At the APRA Awards of 2007 Ross and bandmates, Myles Heskett and Andrew Stockdale, won the Songwriter of the Year category. After leaving Wolfmother with Heskett, the pair worked as Doom Buggy, then they formed Palace of Fire (with Matt Blackman) in 2009. In 2011 Ross and Heskett formed Good Heavens with Sarah Kelly (ex-theredsunband). Ross was formerly a digital designer and has three children.

== Career ==
=== Wolfmother (2000–2008) ===
Ross grew up in Erskineville, New South Wales. In 2000 on bass guitar and keyboards, he formed a hard rock group with Myles Heskett on drums and Andrew Stockdale on vocals and lead guitar. After "years of jamming in anonymity", the trio released a self-titled extended play in 2004 under the name "Wolfmother". Aside from performing on the EP Ross also provided audio mixing and co-wrote the four tracks. The EP was a commercial success, reaching number thirty-five in the ARIA Singles Chart, and led to the band securing a record deal with Modular Recordings.

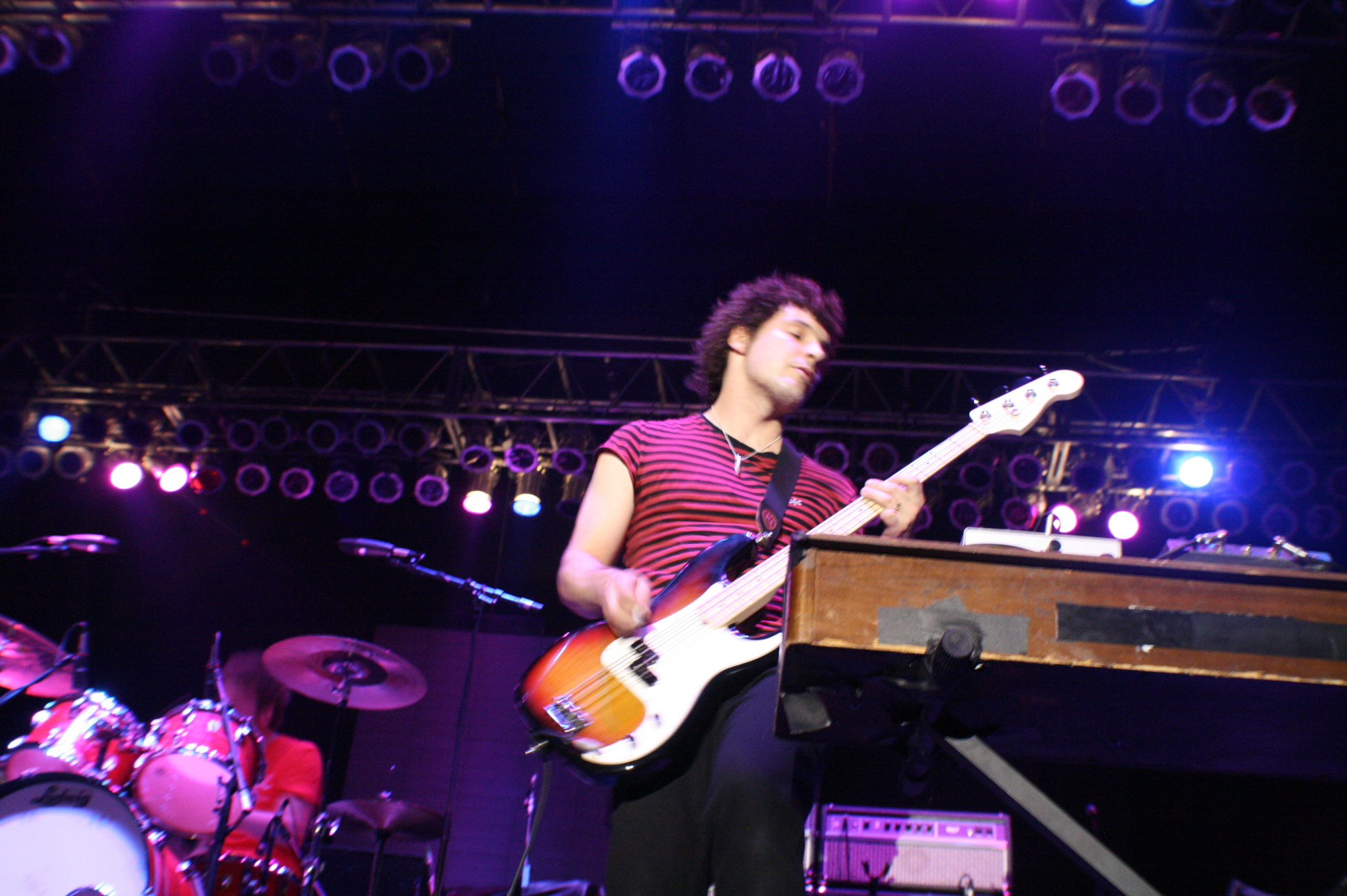
Wolfmother bass guitarist, Chris Ross, performing in May 2007

The band's full-length debut self-titled album was released in Australia in 2005, where it reached number three in the ARIA Albums Chart. Subsequently, released internationally in 2006, the album reached number twenty-two in the American Billboard 200 albums chart and number twenty-five in the UK Albums Chart. At the APRA Awards of 2007 Ross and bandmates, Heskett and Stockdale, won the Songwriters of the Year category.

In August 2008, after a period of "longstanding frictions within the group", Ross left Wolfmother due to "irreconcilable personal and musical differences" with Stockdale. Heskett followed Ross out of the band, while Stockdale continued with a new line up.

=== Post-Wolfmother (2008–present) ===
Immediately after leaving Wolfmother, Ross and Heskett continued with their one-year-old side project, Doom Buggy. Doom Buggy had debuted a year earlier at the Hopetoun Hotel, Sydney, with "electronic instrumentals closer to a Kraftwerk sound" compared to Wolfmother's style. FasterLouder's Adam Lewis reviewed their August 2007 gig, "a handful of well developed and fully formed songs forming their roughly half-hour set ... The music is largely electronic instrumental, with clear krautrock and IDM influences".

In April 2009 the duo joined vocalist and guitarist, Matt Blackman (of Charge Group), to form a new band, Palace of Fire, described by The Vine's Marcus as "combin[ing] the toughness and versatility of Wolfmother with the more refined, cinematic approach of Charge Group and Blackman's former band Purplene". Their debut performance was at the Boogie Rock Festival in Tallarook. In May Palace of Fire supported Battles for their Opera House performances as part of Brian Eno's curated Luminous Festival. Also in 2009 Ross guested on synthesiser for Tucker B's album, Nightmares in the Key of (((((Wow))))).

Ross and Heskett played as members of The Slew (a Kid Koala project) on their world tour. In 2011 Ross and Heskett formed Good Heavens with theredsunband's Sarah Kelly on lead vocals and lead guitar. Good Heavens debut album, Strange Dream, appeared in August 2012 on Rice Is Nice Records. Barnaby Smith of Mess+Noise described the album as "an attractive blend of [Kelly's] cultivated, patient and confident songwriting and [Ross and Heskett's] advanced understanding of exactly where to place noise and distortion". Ross and Heskett presented a Songwriter Speaks session in May 2013 for aspiring songwriters who "not only cross boundaries but hemispheres too".

Chris has worked alongside Jed Kurzel in a live adaptation award -winning score for the controversial Australian film 'Snowtown'. The adaptation was performed live with a full band to a backdrop of previously unreleased footage from the film at MONA's Dark Mofo 2014 in Hobart, Adelaide Festival 2014 and UNSOUND Music Festival in Poland in 2015.

== Personal life ==
Prior to forming Wolfmother in 2000, Ross was an IT specialist. Ross and his partner, Lisa, had their second child in September 2006. They also have a third child.

== Awards and nominations ==
=== APRA Awards ===
The APRA Awards are presented annually from 1982 by the Australasian Performing Right Association (APRA).

Year	Nominee / work	Award	Result
2007	Andrew Stockdale, Myles Heskett, Chris Ross	Songwriters of the Year	Won
2007	"Joker & the Thief" – Stockdale, Heskett, Ross	Song of the Year	Nominated
