= Andrew Stockdale =

Australian musician (born 1976)

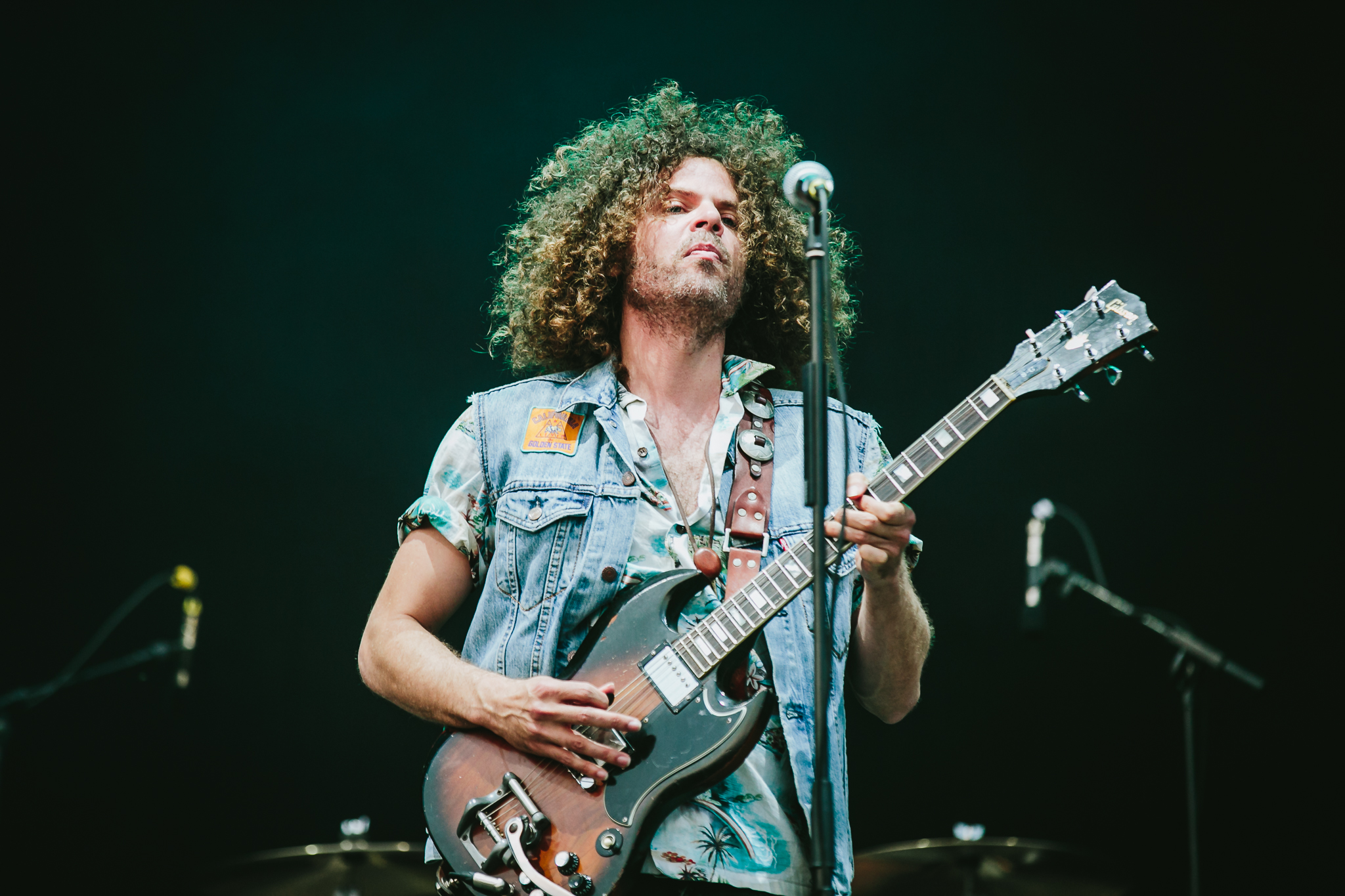
- Stockdale performing in July 2018

Background information
- Born: Andrew James Stockdale; 20 July 1976 (age 50); Brisbane, Australia
- Genres: Hard rock; neo-psychedelia; stoner rock; heavy metal
- Occupations: Singer; musician; songwriter; record producer
- Instruments: Vocals; guitar; bass
- Years active: 2000–present
- Labels: Modular; Universal; Interscope; Island
- Member of: Wolfmother
- Website: wolfmother.com

Andrew James Stockdale (born 20 July 1976) is an Australian singer, musician, songwriter, and record producer. He is best known as the lead vocalist, lead guitarist, and only continuous member of the rock band Wolfmother.

== Early life ==
Andrew James Stockdale was born in Brisbane on 20 July 1976. He was raised in Ashgrove and attended Ashgrove State School, The Gap State High School and Kelvin Grove State College. He briefly lived with his family in the Wimbledon Village area of London, where he attended Wimbledon Middle School, and holds dual Australian and British citizenship due to his father being an English man from Barrow-in-Furness.

== Career ==
=== Wolfmother ===
Stockdale is best known as the lead vocalist, lead guitarist, and only continuous member of the rock band Wolfmother, which he founded in 2004. In 2007, he won "Songwriter of the Year" at the APRA Awards along with his bandmates.

On 24 October 2020, Stockdale performed "Joker & the Thief" at the AFL Grand Final.

=== Other work ===
Aside from his work with Wolfmother, Stockdale was featured on the 2010 single "By the Sword" by Slash, and released a solo album in 2013 called Keep Moving. A second solo effort, Slipstream, was released in 2018.

== Artistry ==
Stockdale's influences most commonly include hard rock and heavy metal guitarists from the late 1960s and early 1970s. Vocally compared to a "cross between Robert Plant and Ozzy Osbourne" by Allmusic, his guitar antics and stage persona are commonly traced to Black Sabbath guitarist Tony Iommi.

== Equipment ==
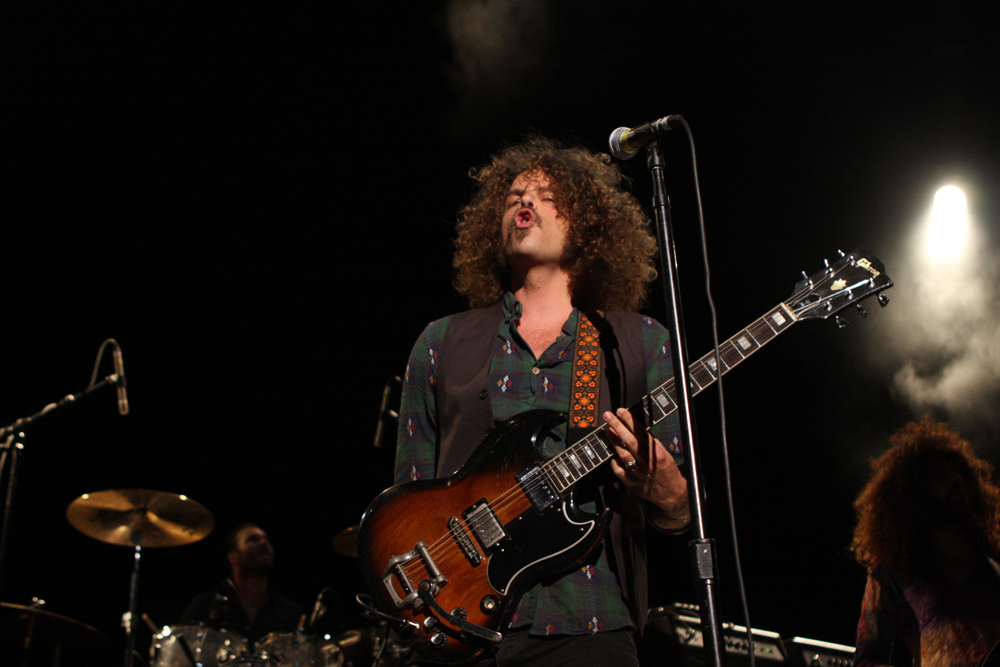
Stockdale briefly dropped the Wolfmother moniker in 2013, before returning to using it later in the year

Stockdale plays Gibson guitars, primarily a 1974 SG standard with a Bigsby vibrato tailpiece in vintage sunburst. He has also been seen using a 1961 Reissue Gibson SG. Other times he uses a Gibson Dot Studio ES-335, a white Gibson Flying V and an alpine white Gibson EDS-1275 with golden hardware. For the recording of the Wolfmother album he used a borrowed Gibson ES-355 through a 1960s Marshall. When playing live, he uses a Vox AC30 and a Marshall JMP. In the past Stockdale has been noted to use Orange amplifiers and cabinets. Stockdale also states to use a Fender Stratocaster, though he prefers the Gibson guitars. In recent times he has also started using a Hohner Blues Master Harmonica microphone for some vocals.

Stockdale's current pedalboard consists of a Boss TU-2, Radial Tone Bone, Fulltone Clyde wah, a Fulltone Supa-Trem, an Electro-Harmonix Microsynth, an Electro-Harmonix Small Stone phaser, an AC booster, and a Digitech Whammy I (locked into place and set for a high octave.) All are patched into a true bypass looper/switcher array and are powered by a Voodoo Labs Pedal Power 2+.

== Discography ==
Studio albums

- Keep Moving (2013) AUS No. 32
- Slipstream (2018)

with Wolfmother

- Wolfmother (2005)
- Cosmic Egg (2009)
- New Crown (2014)
- Victorious (2016)
- Rock'n'Roll Baby (2019)
- Rock Out (2021)

Guest appearances

- Slash – Slash on "By the Sword".
- Beck's Record Club – Songs of Leonard Cohen
- RocKwiz, shown on SBS on 3 October 2009. He played the Wolfmother song "New Moon Rising", then the Stevie Nicks/Don Henley song "Leather and Lace" as a duet with Holiday Sidewinder from Bridezilla.

== Awards and nominations ==
=== APRA Awards ===
The APRA Awards are presented annually from 1982 by the Australasian Performing Right Association (APRA).

Year	Nominee / work	Award	Result
2007	Andrew Stockdale, Myles Heskett, Chris Ross	Songwriters of the Year	Won
2007	"Joker & the Thief" – Stockdale, Heskett, Ross	Song of the Year	Nominated

== Other sources ==
- Browne, Sally (23 April 2006). "On Wolf Patrol". The Courier Mail. Archived from the original on 13 May 2006.
