= Jet discography =

Band discography

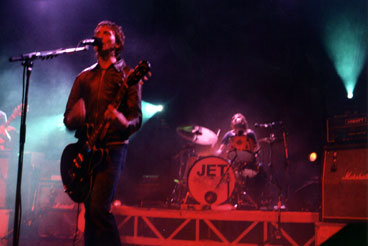
- Nic (left) and Chris Cester of Jet in 2004
- Studio albums: 3
- Extended plays: 1
- Live albums: 1
- Compilation albums: 1
- Singles: 14

Australian rock band Jet have released three studio albums, one live albums, one compilation albums, one extended play and 14 singles.

== Albums ==
=== Studio albums ===
Title	Album details	Peak chart positions										Sales	Certifications
Title	Album details	AUS	AUT	FRA	GER	IRL	ITA	NZ	SWI	UK	US	Sales	Certifications
Get Born	Released: 7 October 2003; Label: Capitol; Elektra; Formats: CD, digital download, LP	1	51	101	19	40	14	17	85	14	26	AUS: 660,000 (Note: Sales as of January 2013); US: 1,700,000 (Note: Sales as of March 2012); WW: 4,000,000 (Note: Worldwide sales as of September 2006)	ARIA: 8× Platinum; BPI: Platinum; RIAA: Platinum
Shine On	Released: 3 October 2006; Label: Capitol; Atlantic; Formats: CD, digital download, LP	3	34	140	47	57	33	35	30	13	16	US: 137,000 (Note: Sales as of February 2007)	ARIA: Platinum; BPI: Gold
Shaka Rock	Released: 25 August 2009; Label: Real Horrorshow; Five Seven; EMI; Tenth Street; Formats: CD, digital download, LP	5	38	135	59	—	—	22	15	53	27		ARIA: Platinum; RMNZ: Gold
"—" denotes a recording that did not chart or was not released in that territory.

=== Live albums ===
Title	Album details
Get Born Live	Released: May 2018; Label: Bloodlines; Formats: CD, digital download, LP, streaming

=== Compilation albums ===
Title	Album details
Rare Tracks	Released: 9 March 2004; Label: Elektra

=== Video albums ===
Title	Album details	Certification
Right! Right! Right!	Released: October 2004; Label: Capitol	ARIA: 2× Platinum
Family Style	Released: 23 November 2004 (US and Europe); Label: Atlantic	

== Extended plays ==
Title	Details	Peak chart positions
Title	Details	UK
Dirty Sweet	Released: November 2002; Label: Rubber	131

== Singles ==
Title	Year	Peak chart positions										Certifications	Album
Title	Year	AUS	CAN	FRA	GER	IRL	NLD	NZ	SCO	UK	US	Certifications	Album
"Are You Gonna Be My Girl"	2003	20	—	168	49	18	22	17	13	16	29	ARIA: Gold; BPI: Platinum; RIAA: Gold; RMNZ: 2× Platinum	Get Born
"Rollover DJ"	2003	31	70	—	—	—	—	—	30	34	—		Get Born
"Look What You've Done"	2004	14	—	—	—	—	—	16	20	28	37	RIAA: Gold	Get Born
"Cold Hard Bitch"	2004	33	20	—	—	—	—	—	35	34	55	RMNZ: Gold	Get Born
"Get Me Outta Here" (UK single)	2004	—	—	—	—	—	—	—	44	37	—		Get Born
"Put Your Money Where Your Mouth Is"	2006	14	—	—	—	—	—	—	14	23	— (Note: "Put Your Money Where Your Mouth Is" did not enter the Billboard Hot 100, but peaked at number 9 on the Bubbling Under Hot 100 Singles chart, which acts as an extension to the Hot 100.)		Shine On
"Bring It On Back"	2006	—	—	—	—	—	—	—	32	51	—		Shine On
"Rip It Up"	2006	49	—	—	—	—	—	—	—	— (Note: "Rip It Up" did not enter the UK Singles Chart, but peaked at number 97 on the Physical Singles Chart.)	—		Shine On
"Shine On"	2007	54	—	—	—	—	—	—	47	114	—		Shine On
"The Wild One" (with Iggy Pop)	2008	66	—	—	—	—	—	—	—	—	—		Non-album single
"She's a Genius"	2009	20	59	—	—	—	—	18	58	124	—	ARIA: Gold; RMNZ: Gold	Shaka Rock
"Black Hearts (On Fire)"	2009	—	—	—	—	—	—	—	—	—	—		Shaka Rock
"Seventeen"	2010	31	—	—	—	—	—	—	—	—	—	ARIA: Gold	Shaka Rock
"My Name Is Thunder" (with The Bloody Beetroots)	2017	—	—	—	—	—	—	—	—	—	—		Non-album singles
"Hurry Hurry"	2024	—	—	—	—	—	—	—	—	—	—		Non-album singles
"—" denotes a recording that did not chart or was not released in that territory.

=== Promotional single ===
Title	Year	Peak chart positions			Album
Title	Year	US Active	US Heri.	US Main	Album
"Stand Up"	2007	22	20	22	Shine On

== Music videos ==
Year	Title	Album	Director
2003	"Rollover DJ"	Get Born	Chris Milk
2003	"Are You Gonna Be My Girl?"	Get Born	Robert Hales
2004	"Look What You've Done" (Version 1)	Get Born	Tom Koh
2004	"Look What You've Done" (Version 2)	Get Born	Robert Hales
2004	"Cold Hard Bitch"	Get Born	Tomorrow's Brightest Minds
2006	"Put Your Money Where Your Mouth Is"	Shine On	Ella Red
2006	"Bring It On Back"	Shine On	Jamie Thraves
2006	"Rip It Up"	Shine On	STEAM Motion and Sound
2006	"Shine On"	Shine On	Karin Fong and Dana Garman
2009	"She's a Genius"	Shaka Rock	Lachlan Dickie
2009	"K.I.A. (Killed In Action)"	Shaka Rock	
2009	"Black Hearts (On Fire)"	Shaka Rock	Robin Davey
2010	"Seventeen"	Shaka Rock	
2017	"My Name Is Thunder"	Non-album single	Roberto Graziano Moro and Filipino Bano
2024	"Hurry Hurry"	Non-album single	Nick Wyatt

=== Other appearances ===
Title	Year	Album
"Are You Gonna Be My Girl"	2003	Madden NFL 2004 (video game)
"Hold On"	2004	Music from and Inspired by Spider-Man 2
"Hey Kids"	2005	Elektra: The Album
"Look What You've Done"	2005	A Lot Like Love (Music from the Motion Picture)
"Rip It Up"	2007	Teenage Mutant Ninja Turtles: Music from the Motion Picture
"Falling Star"	2007	Music from and Inspired by Spider-Man 3
"One Hipster One Bullit"	2009	Soundtrack 90210
"Timothy Where You Been" (Timbaland feat. Jet and JoJo)	2009	Shock Value II
"Start The Show"	2010	Major League Baseball 2K10 (video game)
