= New Moon Rising World Tour =

2009–11 concert tour by Wolfmother

- Promotional world tour by Wolfmother
- Location: Australia; Europe; North America
- Associated album: Cosmic Egg
- Start date: 17 September 2009
- End date: 18 June 2011
- Legs: 10
- No. of shows: 113

The New Moon Rising World Tour, also referred to as the Cosmic Egg Tour, was a concert tour by Australian rock band Wolfmother. The tour began on 17 September 2009 with a seven-show leg in Australia, followed by a short European tour in October, a North American leg comprising 24 shows and initially called for a second European leg in 2010. This was followed by an eleven show run in Australia, supporting AC/DC. The band then returned to North America, playing Lollapalooza and various other venues, including two shows in Mexico, and toured Asia and Australia in fall 2010. In early 2011, the band played the Big Day Out festivals in Australia and New Zealand. The tour then culminated after a round of festival and headlining dates in Europe over the summer, and went the studio to commence work on a third studio album. The tour was in support of the band's second album Cosmic Egg, and was the first to be completed by the four-piece lineup of the band formed in January 2009 after the original trio's breakup in August 2008.

On 30 May 2010, the band cancelled their entire tour of Europe, which would have had dates from May through July. The leg was cancelled due to illness. The band was due to play at many festivals, including Rock Am Ring, Rock Im Park, and Download Festival.

== Set lists ==
=== Australia 2009 ===
19 September 2009
1. "Dimension"
2. "Cosmic Egg"
3. "White Unicorn"
4. "New Moon Rising"
5. "Woman"
6. "White Feather"
7. "Mind's Eye"
8. "Vagabond"
9. "10,000 Feet"
10. "Colossal"

Encore:

11. "Back Round"
12. "Joker & the Thief"
26 September 2009
1. "Joker & the Thief"
2. "Back Round"
3. "Colossal"
4. "New Moon Rising"
5. "Woman"
6. "Dimension"
7. "White Feather"
8. "Vagabond"
9. "Cosmic Egg"
10. "Mind's Eye"

Encore:

11. "California Queen"
12. "White Unicorn"

=== Europe 2009 ===
14 October 2009
1. "Dimension"
2. "Cosmic Egg"
3. "White Unicorn"
4. "New Moon Rising"
5. "Woman"
6. "White Feather"
7. "Vagabond"
8. "Mind's Eye"
9. "10,000 Feet"
10. "Colossal"

Encore:

11. "Back Round"
12. "Joker & the Thief"
21 October 2009
1. "Dimension"
2. "Cosmic Egg"
3. "White Feather"
4. "New Moon Rising"
5. "California Queen"
6. "Woman"
7. "White Unicorn"
8. "Colossal"
9. "Sundial"
10. "Pilgrim"
11. "Mind's Eye"

Encore:

12. "Wuthering Heights" (Kate Bush cover)
13. "Vagabond"
14. "Back Round"
15. "Joker & the Thief"

=== North America 2009 ===
29 October 2009
1. "Dimension"
2. "Cosmic Egg"
3. "California Queen"
4. "New Moon Rising"
5. "White Feather"
6. "Woman"
7. "White Unicorn"
8. "Colossal"
9. "Sundial"
10. "Pilgrim"
11. "Mind's Eye"
12. "10,000 Feet"
13. "In the Castle"

Encore:

14. "Wuthering Heights" (Kate Bush cover)
15. "Vagabond"
16. "Back Round"
17. "Joker & the Thief"
30 October 2009
17. "Caroline"
18. "Joker & the Thief"
6 November 2009
1. "Dimension"
2. "California Queen"
3. "Apple Tree"
4. "White Feather"
5. "Woman"
6. "New Moon Rising"
7. "Cosmic Egg"
8. "Colossal"
9. "Sundial"
10. "10,000 Feet"
11. "In the Castle"
12. "Mind's Eye"
13. "White Unicorn"

Encore:

14. "Wuthering Heights" (Kate Bush cover)
15. "Vagabond"
16. "Back Round"
17. "Joker & the Thief"
7 November 2009
1. "Dimension"
2. "Cosmic Egg"
3. "California Queen"
4. "New Moon Rising"
5. "Woman"
6. "White Unicorn"
7. "White Feather"
8. "Colossal"
9. "Sundial"
10. "Apple Tree"
11. "Mind's Eye"
12. "In the Castle"

Encore:

13. "Vagabond"
14. "Back Round"
15. "Joker & the Thief"
11 November 2009
1. "Dimension"
2. "Cosmic Egg"
3. "California Queen"
4. "New Moon Rising"
5. "Woman"
6. "White Feather"
7. "White Unicorn"
8. "Colossal"
9. "Sundial"
10. "Apple Tree"
11. "10,000 Feet"
12. "In the Castle"

Encore:

13. "Vagabond"
14. "Back Round"
15. "Joker & the Thief"
13 and 19 November 2009
1. "Dimension"
2. "Cosmic Egg"
3. "California Queen"
4. "New Moon Rising"
5. "Woman"
6. "White Unicorn"
7. "Colossal"
8. "White Feather"
9. "Sundial"
10. "Apple Tree"
11. "10,000 Feet"
12. "In the Castle"

Encore:

13. "Vagabond"
14. "Back Round"
15. "Joker & the Thief"
23 November 2009
1. "Dimension"
2. "Cosmic Egg"
3. "California Queen"
4. "New Moon Rising"
5. "Woman"
6. "White Unicorn"
7. "Sundial"
8. "White Feather"
9. "Colossal"
10. "Apple Tree"

Encore:

11. "Vagabond"
12. "Back Round"
13. "Joker & the Thief"
24 November 2009
1. "Dimension"
2. "Cosmic Egg"
3. "California Queen"
4. "New Moon Rising"
5. "Woman"
6. "White Unicorn"
7. "Colossal"
8. "White Feather"
9. "10,000 Feet"
10. "Sundial"
11. "Apple Tree"
12. "In the Castle"

Encore:

14. "By the Sword" (with Slash)
15. "Vagabond"
16. "Joker & the Thief"

=== Europe 2010 ===
14 January 2010
1. "Dimension"
2. "Cosmic Egg"
3. "California Queen"
4. "New Moon Rising"
5. "White Unicorn"
6. "White Feather"
7. "Woman"
8. "Colossal"
9. "Apple Tree"
10. "Sundial"
11. "Back Round"
12. "In the Castle"

Encore:

13. "Vagabond"
14. "Joker & the Thief"
15 January 2010
1. "Dimension"
2. "California Queen"
3. "Cosmic Egg"
4. "New Moon Rising"
5. "Woman"
6. "White Unicorn"
7. "Colossal"
8. "Apple Tree"
9. "White Feather"
10. "Back Round"
11. "10,000 Feet"
12. "In the Castle"

Encore:

13. "Vagabond"
14. "Joker & the Thief"
18 January 2010
1. "Dimension"
2. "Cosmic Egg"
3. "California Queen"
4. "New Moon Rising"
5. "Woman"
6. "White Unicorn"
7. "Colossal"
8. "Apple Tree"
9. "White Feather"
10. "Far Away"
11. "Back Round"
12. "10,000 Feet"
13. "In the Castle"

Encore:

14. "Vagabond"
15. "Joker & the Thief"
19 January 2010
11. "Sundial"
12. "Back Round"
13. "10,000 Feet"
14. "In the Castle"

Encore:

14. "Vagabond"
15. "Joker & the Thief"
24 January 2010
1. "Dimension"
2. "Cosmic Egg"
3. "New Moon Rising"
4. "Woman"
5. "White Unicorn"
6. "10,000 Feet"
7. "Colossal"
8. "Pilgrim"
9. "Apple Tree"
10. "White Feather"
11. "Phoenix"
12. "Back Round"
13. "In the Castle"

Encore:

14. "Vagabond"
15. "Joker & the Thief"
26 and 29 January 2010
1. "Dimension"
2. "Cosmic Egg"
3. "California Queen"
4. "New Moon Rising"
5. "Woman"
6. "White Unicorn"
7. "10,000 Feet"
8. "Apple Tree"
9. "Colossal"
10. "White Feather"
11. "Sundial"
12. "Pilgrim"
13. "Back Round"
14. "In the Castle"

Encore:

15. "Vagabond"
16. "Joker & the Thief"
30 January 2010
14. "Far Away"
15. "In the Castle"

Encore:

15. "Vagabond"
16. "Joker & the Thief"
2 February 2010
1. "Dimension"
2. "Cosmic Egg"
3. "California Queen"
4. "New Moon Rising"
5. "Woman"
6. "Apple Tree"
7. "10,000 Feet"
8. "Colossal"
9. "White Feather"
10. "Sundial"
11. "White Unicorn"
12. "Pilgrim"
13. "Back Round"
14. "In the Castle"

Encore:

15. "Vagabond"
16. "Joker & the Thief"
3 February 2010
1. "Dimension"
2. "Cosmic Egg"
3. "California Queen"
4. "New Moon Rising"
5. "Woman"
6. "Riders on the Storm" (The Doors cover)
7. "Lady Madonna" (The Beatles cover)
8. "White Unicorn"
9. "Colossal"
10. "Apple Tree"
11. "10,000 Feet"
12. "White Feather"
13. "Sundial"
14. "Pilgrim"
15. "Back Round"
16. "Far Away"
17. "In the Castle"

Encore:

18. "Wuthering Heights" (Kate Bush cover)
19. "Vagabond"
20. "Joker & the Thief"

=== Australia 2010 (AC/DC) ===
15 February 2010
1. "Dimension"
2. "Cosmic Egg"
3. "California Queen"
4. "New Moon Rising"
5. "Woman"
6. "Riders on the Storm" (The Doors cover)
7. "Joker & the Thief"
25 February 2010
1. "Dimension"
2. "Cosmic Egg"
3. "California Queen"
4. "New Moon Rising"
5. "Woman"
6. "White Unicorn"
7. "Riders on the Storm" (The Doors cover)
8. "Joker & the Thief"

== Tour dates ==
Date	City	Country	Venue
Australia
17 September 2009	Brisbane	Australia	Tivoli Theatre
19 September 2009	Sydney	Australia	Enmore Theatre
23 September 2009	Perth	Australia	Capitol Theatre
24 September 2009	Adelaide	Australia	HQ Live
25 September 2009	Melbourne	Australia	The Palace
26 September 2009	Melbourne	Australia	Pier Hotel
2 October 2009	Sydney	Australia	Moore Park
Europe
14 October 2009	Paris	France	Le Trabendo
15 October 2009	Amsterdam	Netherlands	Melkweg
16 October 2009	Hamburg	Germany	Knust
17 October 2009	Berlin	Germany	Columbia Club
21 October 2009	London	United Kingdom	The Coronet
North America
24 October 2009	Mountain View	United States	Shoreline Amphitheatre
25 October 2009	Mountain View	United States	Shoreline Amphitheatre
29 October 2009	Dallas	United States	House of Blues
30 October 2009	Austin	United States	Stubb's
31 October 2009	New Orleans	United States	Voodoo Experience
2 November 2009	Atlanta	United States	The Tabernacle
3 November 2009	Charlotte	United States	The Fillmore – Charlotte
4 November 2009	Washington, D.C.	United States	9:30 Club
6 November 2009	Philadelphia	United States	Electric Factory
7 November 2009	Boston	United States	House of Blues
8 November 2009	New York City	United States	Terminal 5
9 November 2009	New York City	United States	Music Hall of Williamsburg
11 November 2009	Toronto	Canada	Kool Haus
12 November 2009	Pontiac	United States	Clutch Cargo
13 November 2009	Chicago	United States	Riviera Theatre
14 November 2009	Minneapolis	United States	State Theatre
16 November 2009	Denver	United States	Ogden Theatre
17 November 2009	Salt Lake City	United States	The Depot
19 November 2009	Portland	United States	Roseland Theater
20 November 2009	Seattle	United States	Paramount Theatre
21 November 2009	Vancouver	Canada	Queen Elizabeth Theatre
22 November 2009	Los Angeles	United States	The Avalon
23 November 2009	Oakland	United States	Fox Oakland Theatre
24 November 2009	Los Angeles	United States	Wiltern Theatre
Australia
22 December 2009	Byron Bay	Australia	Buddha Bar
23 December 2009	Byron Bay	Australia	Hotel Great Northern
29 December 2009	Lorne	Australia	Falls Festival
30 December 2009	Marion Bay	Australia	Falls Festival
9 January 2010	Busselton	Australia	Southbound Festival
Europe
13 January 2010	Dublin	Ireland	Olympia
14 January 2010	Glasgow	United Kingdom	Glasgow Academy
15 January 2010	Newcastle upon Tyne	United Kingdom	O2 Academy Newcastle
17 January 2010	Manchester	United Kingdom	Manchester Academy
18 January 2010	Leeds	United Kingdom	O2 Academy Leeds
19 January 2010	Birmingham	United Kingdom	O2 Academy Birmingham
21 January 2010	London	United Kingdom	O2 Academy Brixton
22 January 2010	Norwich	United Kingdom	University of East Anglia
24 January 2010	Brussels	Belgium	Cirque Royal
25 January 2010	Paris	France	Bataclan
26 January 2010	Tilburg	Netherlands	Tilburg O13
28 January 2010	Zürich	Switzerland	Volkhaus
29 January 2010	Munich	Germany	Backstage Week
30 January 2010	Cologne	Germany	Live Music Hall
1 February 2010	Stockholm	Sweden	Berns Salonger
2 February 2010	Copenhagen	Denmark	Vega
3 February 2010	Hamburg	Germany	Große Freiheit
Australia, Supporting AC/DC (Not July dates)
11 February 2010	Melbourne	Australia	Etihad Stadium
13 February 2010	Melbourne	Australia	Etihad Stadium
15 February 2010	Melbourne	Australia	Etihad Stadium
18 February 2010	Sydney	Australia	ANZ Stadium
20 February 2010	Sydney	Australia	ANZ Stadium
22 February 2010	Sydney	Australia	ANZ Stadium
25 February 2010	Brisbane	Australia	QSAC
27 February 2010	Brisbane	Australia	QSAC
2 March 2010	Adelaide	Australia	Adelaide Oval
6 March 2010	Perth	Australia	Subiaco Oval
8 March 2010	Perth	Australia	Subiaco Oval
10 July 2010	Brisbane	Australia	The Globe Theatre
29 July 2010	St Kilda	Australia	Gershwin Room at The Espy
31 July 2010	Byron Bay	Australia	Splendour in the Grass
North America
8 August 2010	Chicago	United States	Lollapalooza
9 August 2010	Kansas City	United States	Beaumont Club
10 August 2010	Council Bluffs	United States	Harrah's Stir Cove
11 August 2010	Sturgis	United States	Sturgis Rally at Glencoe Camp Resort
12 August 2010	Aspen	United States	Belly Up Aspen
14 August 2010	San Francisco	United States	Outside Lands Music and Arts Festival
15 August 2010	Santa Barbara	United States	Santa Barbara Bowl
19 August 2010	Anaheim	United States	House of Blues
20 August 2010	Paradise	United States	Hard Rock Hotel and Casino
21 August 2010	San Diego	United States	House of Blues
26 August 2010	Mexico City	Mexico	Casino Metropolitano
27 August 2010	Guadalajara	Mexico	Mansion Magnolia
Asia/Australia
10 October 2010	Jakarta	Indonesia	Carnaval Beach
22 October 2010	Wollongong	Australia	Waves Nightclub
23 October 2010	Newcastle	Australia	Camp Shortland
20 November 2010	Townsville	Australia	Townsville Rugby Grounds
Oceania
21 January 2011	Auckland	New Zealand	Mt. Smart Stadium – Big Day Out
23 January 2011	Gold Coast	Australia	Parklands Showground – Big Day Out
24 January 2011	Byron Bay	Australia	Hotel Great Northern
26 January 2011	Sydney	Australia	Sydney Showgrounds – Big Day Out
27 January 2011	Sydney	Australia	Sydney Showgrounds – Big Day Out
30 January 2011	Melbourne	Australia	Flemington Racecourse – Big Day Out
31 January 2011	Ballarat	Australia	The Karova Lounge
1 February 2011	Geelong	Australia	Eureka Bar
4 February 2011	Adelaide	Australia	Adelaide Showgrounds – Big Day Out
6 February 2011	Perth	Australia	Claremont Showground – Big Day Out
23 April 2011	Byron Bay	Australia	Bluesfest
Europe
30 May 2011	Edinburgh	United Kingdom	Edinburgh Picture House
31 May 2011	Liverpool	United Kingdom	O2 Academy Liverpool
1 June 2011	London	United Kingdom	London Forum
3 June 2011	Nürburgring	Germany	Rock Am Ring
4 June 2011	Hasseleholm	Sweden	Siesta
5 June 2011	Nuremberg	Germany	Rock Im Park
7 June 2011	Milan	Italy	Live Club
9 June 2011	Crans-sur-Nyon	Switzerland	Caribana Festival
10 June 2011	Interlaken	Switzerland	Greenfield Festival
11 June 2011	Nickelsdorf	Austria	Nova Rock Festival
12 June 2011	Landgraaf	Netherlands	Pinkpop
14 June 2011	Groningen	Netherlands	De Oosterport
16 June 2011	Moscow	Russia	Arena Moscow (cancelled)
18 June 2011	Seinäjoki	Finland	Provinssirock

== Personnel ==
- Andrew Stockdale – lead vocals, lead guitar
- Ian Peres – bass, keyboard, backing vocals
- Aidan Nemeth – rhythm guitar
- Dave Atkins – drums (until April 2010)
- Will Rockwell-Scott – drums (April 2010 onwards)
