= Sound Relief =

2009 benefit concert in Australia

- Created by: Michael Gudinski; Michael Chugg; Amanda Pelman; Joe Segreto; Tom Lang; Mark Pope
- Presented by: Melbourne; Molly Meldrum; Michael Gudinski; John Brumby; Tony Hawk; Dave Hughes; Ed Kavalee; Hamish & Andy; Red Symons; Sydney; Tim Ross; Kate Ritchie
- Starring: Melbourne; Jet; Gabriella Cilmi; Kings of Leon; Paul Kelly; Augie March; Bliss N Eso; Paris Wells; Kasey Chambers; Shane Nicholson; Troy Cassar-Daley; Liam Finn; Crowded House; Jack Johnson; Wolfmother; Kylie Minogue; Hunters & Collectors; Split Enz; Midnight Oil; Sydney; Coldplay; Wolfmother; Hoodoo Gurus; Little Birdy; Architecture in Helsinki; You Am I Josh Pyke; Marcia Hines; Taylor Swift; Eskimo Joe; Jet; Kylie Minogue; The Presets; Icehouse; Barry Gibb; Olivia Newton-John
- Country of origin: Australia

Production
- Production locations: Melbourne Cricket Ground; Sydney Cricket Ground, Australia
- Camera setup: Multi camera
- Running time: 12:10 until 22:30 (Melbourne); 12:15 until 22:30 (Sydney)

Original release
- Network: Max (Sydney); Channel V Australia
- Release: 14 March 2009

Sound Relief was a multi-venue rock music concert held on 14 March 2009, which was announced by the Premier of Victoria, John Brumby on 24 February 2009. The event was organised by Michael Gudinski, Michael Chugg, Amanda Pelman, Joe Segreto & Tom Lang of IMC/Homebake Festival and Mark Pope to raise funds for those affected by the February 2009 Victorian bushfires.

The event was held simultaneously at the Melbourne Cricket Ground and the Sydney Cricket Ground. All the proceeds from the Melbourne Concert and half of the proceeds of the Sydney Concert went to the Red Cross Victorian Bushfire Appeal. The other half of the Sydney proceeds went to the Queensland Premier's Disaster Relief Appeal to help flood victims.

A special presentation was held midway through the concerts, with a satellite link between the two venues. At this time, Kylie Minogue, at the Melbourne event, performed "I Still Call Australia Home" and Australian actress Toni Collette introducing Princes William and Harry who sent their support via satellite. The Princes' speech at Sound Relief was their first ever to the nation and as such, made Australian Constitutional history. Jet and Wolfmother flew interstate to play at both concerts.

Hunters & Collectors reunited for the first time in over 10 years for the concert. The finale of the show was Midnight Oil who had reformed to perform on the Melbourne stage at the MCG. Lead singer Peter Garrett, was then also Australia's Minister for Environment and the Arts.

Some members of Crowded House made a surprise appearance with Liam Finn to perform three of their hits. Kings of Leon chose not to perform their popular No. 1 hit, Sex on Fire, out of respect for the bushfire victims. Footage was released on DVD on 9 October. It contains partial 9-hour footage of the concert but every artist who performed at the event is represented. The DVD debuted at No. 2 in the Australian ARIA Top 40 DVDs, has been certified 5× Platinum.

== The Concerts ==
=== Melbourne Cricket Ground ===
The line-up for the Melbourne concert featured:

- Jet – "Rip it Up", "Are You Gonna Be My Girl", "Get Me Outta Here", "Look What You've Done" (12:10 pm)
- Gabriella Cilmi – "Got No Place to Go", "Sweet About Me", "Don't Wanna Go To Bed Now", "Save the Lies", "Whole Lotta Love" (12:55 pm)
- Kings of Leon – "Crawl", "Revelry", "On Call", "Use Somebody" (1:40 pm)
- Paul Kelly – "Dumb Things", "To Her Door", "God Told Me To", "Leaps and Bounds", "How to Make Gravy", "Meet me in the Middle of the Air" (2:20 pm)
- Augie March – "Lupus", "Pennywhistle", "Brundisium", "There Is No Such Place", "This Train Will Be Taking No Passengers", "One Crowded Hour" (3:05 pm)
- Bliss N Eso with Paris Wells – "Up Jumped The Boogie", "Eye of the Storm", "Bullet and a Target", "Remember Me", "Party at my Place", "Field of Dreams", "The Sea is Rising" (3:50 pm)
- Kasey Chambers & Shane Nicholson with Troy Cassar-Daley – "Rattlin Bones", "Monkey on a Wire", "The Captain", "The House That Never Was" (4:35 pm)
- Liam Finn special appearance by Crowded House – "Second Chance", "Lead Balloon", "Don't Dream It's Over", "Weather With You", "Better Be Home Soon" (5:30 pm)
- Jack Johnson – "Sitting Waiting Wishing", "Flake", "Banana Pancakes", "Times Like These", "Better Together" (6:20 pm)
- Wolfmother – "Back Round", "Dimension", "Woman", "White Unicorn", "Joker and the Thief" (7:00 pm)
- Kylie Minogue – "I Still Call Australia Home" (a cappella) (7:50 pm)
- Hunters & Collectors – "When the River Runs Dry", "Do You See What I See", "Blind Eye", "Say Goodbye", "Holy Grail", "Throw Your Arms Around Me", "The Slab" (encore) (8:00 pm)
- Split Enz – "Shark Attack", "Poor Boy", "I Got You", "Message to My Girl", "Dirty Creature", "Pioneer", "Six Months in a Leaky Boat", "History Never Repeats", "I See Red" (8:55 pm)
- Midnight Oil – "Redneck Wonderland", "Read About It", "Blue Sky Mine" (incorrectly listed as "Blue Sky Mining" on the DVD banner), "Advance Australia Fair" (instrumental), "One Country", "Beds Are Burning", "King of the Mountain", "The Dead Heart", "Power and the Passion", "Best of Both Worlds", "Sometimes" (encore) (9:50)

A number of celebrities shared the MC duties between performances, including music industry icon Molly Meldrum, music producer and event co-organiser Michael Gudinski, Victorian premier John Brumby, skateboarder Tony Hawk and announcers from a range of radio stations, including Dave Hughes, Ed Kavalee, Hamish & Andy and Red Symons.

During Split Enz's performance of "I See Red", Red Symons walked across the stage, so vocalist Tim Finn literally did "see Red"

The MCG concert sold out quickly, with over 80,000 tickets sold. That makes the Melbourne event the largest paid concert event in Australian history.

=== Sydney Cricket Ground ===
The line-up for the Sydney concert featured:

- Coldplay – "Life in Technicolor", "Yellow", "Lost!", "Clocks", "Viva La Vida", "You're the Voice" (featuring John Farnham), "Fix You"
- Hoodoo Gurus – "Tojo", "The Right Time", "Like Wow – Wipeout", "What's My Scene", "Come Anytime"
- Little Birdy – "Come on Come On", "Six Months in a Leaky Boat", "Brother", "Beautiful To Me"
- Architecture in Helsinki – "Hold Music", "Do The Whirlwind", "Heart It Races", "That Beep"
- You Am I – "Frightfully Moderne", "It Ain't Funny How We Don't Talk Anymore", "Gunslingers", "How Much is Enough", "Berlin Chair", "Thank God I've Hit The Bottom", "The Piano up the Tree"
- Josh Pyke – "Lines on Palms", "The Summer", "Make You Happy", "Don't Wanna Let You Down", "Middle of the Hill", "Memories And Dust"
- Marcia Hines – "Fire and Rain"
- Taylor Swift – "You Belong with Me", "Our Song", "Love Story", "Change"
- Eskimo Joe – "Sarah", "Inshalla", "Foreign Land", "London Bombs", "From the Sea", "Black Fingernails, Red Wine"
- Jet – "Rip It Up", "Are You Gonna Be My Girl", "She's A Genius", "Shine On", "Put Your Money Where Your Mouth Is", "Cold Hard Bitch"
- The Presets – "Talk Like That", "Yippiyo-Ay", "Are You The One?", "This Boy's in Love", "Kicking And Screaming", "My People"
- Icehouse – "We Can Get Together", "Crazy", "Electric Blue", "Can't Help Myself", "Great Southern Land"
- Barry Gibb with Olivia Newton-John – "To Love Somebody", "Jive Talkin'", "Words", "Islands in the Stream", "I Honestly Love You", "How Can You Mend a Broken Heart", "Guilty", "You Should Be Dancing", "Spicks and Specks"

Coldplay singer Chris Martin historically ran into the crowd towards the end of their song "Fix You" and did not make it back for the end of the song, but the crowd continued to sing anyway. Once he made it back to the stage he then repeated the end of the song, but was so exhausted that he let the crowd sing the final line. He was then unwell after the performance and spent the afternoon vomiting, still managing to play a second show that night.

Eskimo Joe, Wolfmother and Jet all premiered new songs that had not been released yet. Eskimo Joe sung "Foreign Land" and "Inshalla", Wolfmother sang "Back Round" and Jet sang "She's A Genius".

Little Birdy sang "Six Months in a Leaky Boat" in Sydney and Split Enz would sing it at Melbourne later that night. While Jet and Wolfmother played most of their songs at both concerts, this was the only song to be played at both concerts by two separate artists.

Australian actress Toni Collette introduced Princes William and Harry who sent their support via satellite.

The Presets performed parts of their song during the middle of a lightning storm.

== Media coverage ==
On television, the Sydney concert was broadcast on XYZnetworks-owned pay TV music channel Max, with the Melbourne concert was broadcast on sister channel Channel V.

On radio, Triple J produced a feed syndicated to commercial radio networks for free, with acts from both concerts produced by the station's live music team. Aside from the station itself, the feed was aired on the Triple M, Nova and Vega networks.

== Certifications ==
The DVD was released in 2009 and was certified 5× Platinum in Australia by December 2009.

| Region | Certification | Certified units/sales |
|---|---|---|
| Australia (ARIA) | 5× Platinum | 75,000^{^} |
^{^} Shipments figures based on certification alone.
