= Cosmic Egg =

Studio album by Wolfmother
- Released: 23 October 2009
- Recorded: April–May 2009
- Studios: Sound City, Van Nuys; Sunset Sound, Hollywood
- Genres: Hard rock; psychedelic rock
- Length: 53:40
- Label: Modular
- Producer: Alan Moulder

Wolfmother chronology
Wolfmother (2005)	Cosmic Egg (2009)	New Crown (2014)

Cosmic Egg Deluxe edition

Singles from Cosmic Egg
- 1. "Back Round" Released: 2 June 2009; 2. "New Moon Rising" Released: 25 August 2009; 3. "White Feather" Released: 29 December 2009; 4. "Far Away" Released: 10 June 2010

Cosmic Egg is the second studio album by Australian rock band Wolfmother, released on 23 October 2009. It is the first album by the second lineup of the band, featuring founding vocalist, songwriter and lead guitarist Andrew Stockdale, with new members bassist and keyboardist Ian Peres, rhythm guitarist Aidan Nemeth and drummer Dave Atkins, formed in 2009 after original members Chris Ross and Myles Heskett left in August 2008. Upon its release, Cosmic Egg peaked at number three on the Australian ARIA Albums Chart, the same position as the band's first album. The album was the only studio release by the band to feature Atkins, who left the band in April 2010 during the Cosmic Egg promotional tour cycle.

The album was recorded between April and May 2009 at Sound City Studios and Sunset Sound Studios in Los Angeles, California. The title of the album comes from a position in yoga described by frontman Stockdale as "like the fetal pose". The album's release was promoted throughout 2009 and 2010 by the New Moon Rising World Tour, beginning in September 2009 in Australia. The first song released from the album was the promotional digital download single "Back Round" on 2 June 2009; "New Moon Rising" was the first full single release from Cosmic Egg, on 25 August 2009.

== History ==
=== Background and composition ===
Mention of a follow-up to the band's 2005 debut studio album Wolfmother began shortly after its international release in 2006. In August, music magazine NME revealed that the band were discussing ideas for their second album, quoting Stockdale as saying "I feel like we've got a lot more to say". In January 2007, MTV reported that "Wolfmother celebrated the news of their Grammy nomination last month by writing a new song, which they've since recorded." The song, then known as "Love Attacker" and "about people who use love as a weapon to manipulate and get their way through desire", later evolved into "Pleased to Meet You" and was featured on the Spider-Man 3 soundtrack released on 1 May 2007. In revealing the news, MTV also suggested fall 2007 as the beginning of the recording process, quoting Andrew Stockdale as saying:

We do have a lot of jams, like incoherent pieces of music, that at least could get the ball rolling [...] And I have a few ideas I've been working on in hotels and stuff, which is kind of the way half of the record was written last time. Sometimes it can be a long process and sometimes it happens really quickly, so you just have to keep the fishing net open for ideas and hope that you catch a few.

In February NME reported that Wolfmother "[felt] good about the second record", explaining that the band wanted to make their follow-up to Wolfmother sound "more relentless and in your face." After more touring and a brief period of inactivity with few updates regarding new material, American magazine Rolling Stone reported in November 2007 that "Wolfmother [were] hard at work on a new album". Speaking on the upcoming album, Stockdale explained that "It's kind of cinematic, and it's kind of epic", going on to suggest that "there's also this fully aggressive side that's undeniably explosive". Among ten songs "ready to go", Stockdale first revealed the name "Back Home", which would eventually evolve into "Back Round".

The first new original material, since the release of "Pleased to Meet You" in 2007, appeared during the band's first performance in nine months at the Queensland Gallery of Modern Art (QGMA) on 12 April 2008 in the form of four new songs: "Back Round", "The Violence of the Sun", "Monolith" and "Inside the Mountain". With increasing discussion of Wolfmother's second album, rumours began to emerge in August 2008 that the band was due to split up; various sources suggested that the trio were experiencing tensions after their performance at Splendour in the Grass on 3 August and that a statement to be released by their management was imminent. The following statement was released to radio station Triple J upon the band's lack of appearance at a scheduled interview:

The band is dealing with some internal issues at the moment. They're hoping to resolve them in the next few weeks but in the meantime it just wouldn't be appropriate for any member to be doing any interviews – even with Triple J.

The statement made by manager John Watson at the time was as follows:

Unfortunately I can't make any comment other than to say that as soon as the band has clear future plans they will issue a statement and we hope to be able to do that in the next week or two.

Within days of the rumours surfacing, reports were updated to make the breakup official; bassist and keyboardist Chris Ross and drummer Myles Heskett departed Wolfmother immediately due to "longstanding frictions". Universal Music Australia released a statement explaining that Ross departed the band first due to "irreconcilable personal and musical differences" and was followed almost immediately by Heskett who was not willing to continue as part of a new line-up. Stockdale, however, promised fans that he would continue the Wolfmother moniker by finding new members to replace the departed co-founders. It was subsequently reported by the band's record label, Modular Recordings, that "Wolfmother Phase II" planned to record their first album with producer Dave Sardy ready for an "early 2009" release.

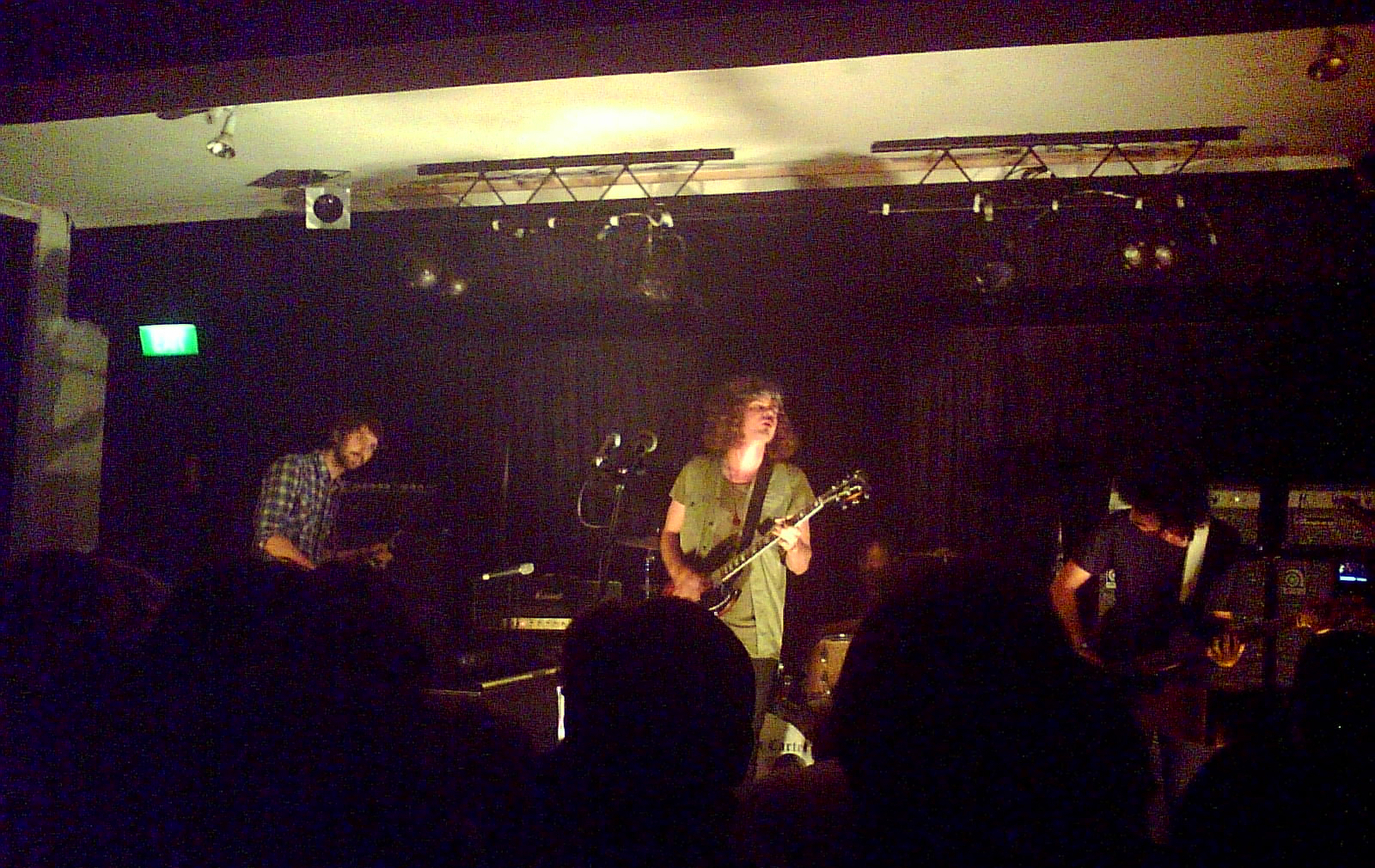
The second lineup of Wolfmother performing for the first time at The Valley Studios, Brisbane on 6 February 2009.

After a number of rumours regarding new members, Wolfmother re-appeared in February 2009, performing under the alias "White Feather"; two low-key gigs were played on 6 February at The Valley Studios, Brisbane and 8 February at Oxford Art Factory, Sydney with new musicians accompanying Stockdale. Following the performances the new members of Wolfmother, who had officially joined the band on 5 January 2009, were confirmed as guitarist Aidan Nemeth, bassist and keyboardist Ian Peres and drummer Dave "Acosta" Atkins, and a new song called "Pilgrim" was mentioned. Other songs debuted at the two low-key comeback performances included "White Feather", "Phoenix", "Far Away" and "10,000 Ft.", complemented by the previously performed "Back Round" and "The Violence of the Sun". In an interview with Triple J in February, Stockdale mentioned a number of songs being considered for the new album, namely "Pilgrim", "Phoenix", "Back Round", "The Violence of the Sun" and the previously unmentioned "Sun Dial". He also revealed that there were 17 new songs written for the album, recording for which was due to begin in March, which he described as "heavy" and "riff driven".

=== Recording and production ===
Stockdale began recording early versions of the new Wolfmother songs in his home-based studio before the new band members were officially unveiled. With subsequent comeback performances made on 14 and 22 March at Sound Relief and Clipsal 500 respectively, the first official material released by "Wolfmother Phase II" was a studio version of "Back Round", made available as a free digital download on the band's official website on 30 March. Stockdale began using his Twitter profile in April, with his first update on 9 April confirming recording progression by revealing that the band were "Onto the 9th song tracking drums", hinting that it "looks like this will be a double album spectacular." On 11 April, Stockdale revealed that they had "Tracked the 14th song," and by 15 April the band had tracked the drums on all 18 songs. The title of the album was revealed as Cosmic Egg by NME in April, who also revealed that the album would contain 18 songs including "White Feather", "The Violence of the Sun" and a title track. On 1 May, Wolfmother performed at the Natural History Museum of Los Angeles County, debuting new songs "Cosmic Egg" and "California Queen". Beginning in late-April, confirmation began spreading that ex-Guns N' Roses and current Velvet Revolver guitarist Slash was to join the band in recording their new album, although it later turned out that the collaboration had resulted in "By the Sword", a song which would later appear on Slash's self-titled debut solo album.

On 9 May, Stockdale reported on his Twitter page that the band had "3 more songs to go, of 17 songs", adding that "this is an endurance test, though the horizon seems closer". Later, he notified readers that he was "About to shred the solo on White Feather", describing it as "possibly the greatest song written since Womac[k] and Womac[k]'s "Foot Steps" Yes!" On 15 May, Stockdale reported that the title track "Cosmic Egg" had been completed, describing it as "a rollicking viking song". On 16 May, Stockdale hinted at the prominence of a string section on the song "10,000 Feet" by revealing that "Dave [Atkins] has done some amazing string arrangements for 10,000 feet, he's a talented guy!" Shortly after this update, a link was posted on the Twitter page to a montage video of the band recording and mixing some songs on the album, including "Back Round" and "Pilgrim". On 20 May, Stockdale reported that the album was near to completion, stating that there are "Ten songs down, Seven to go", adding "we're in double album territory now. It's a vast album". On 22 May, another Twitter update revealed that "tomorrow [23 May] we may well be finished! Then 4 weeks of mixing!" On 30 May, Stockdale reported that the band were "leaving L.A tonight [...] with Album in hand", confirming that recording for Cosmic Egg had been completed.

Cosmic Egg was mixed in Pasadena, California shortly after the recording of the album by Stockdale, producer Alan Moulder and Joe Barresi. On 18 June, Stockdale reported that he had "Just heard a mixed and mastered version of Cosmic Egg the song", describing it as "of[f] the Richter Scale". In the tweet, he also revealed that the album would be released on 13 October 2009. On 3 August, Stockdale revealed that he had "Just recorded some B Sides at Electric Ladyland, Jimi Hendrix's studio in N.Y.", adding that the recordings "Sound[ed] amazing" and had a "great vibe".

== Style and direction ==
In revealing details of the album to NME in April 2009, Stockdale compared Cosmic Egg to the band's debut album Wolfmother by explaining that "Everything is magnified. The heaviness is magnified to heavier state. The simple ones are really simplistic, two-minute songs, and the journey songs are like 12 parts". In a pre-release interview with the singer-songwriter, Rolling Stone Australia described the album as "vintage Wolfmother", mentioning features and qualities such as the "distorted, frenetic, bass-heavy sounds of 'White Feather'" and "the epic 'In the Morning'". MTV also hinted at the style of the album early, explaining that "Tunes like 'California Queen' and 'Sundial' chug along on meaty chords, dive into sludgy breakdowns and sizzle with Stockdale's flame-kissed solos". Writer James Montgomery went on to add that "'Far Away' and 'Pilgrim' are moody, fog-machine ruminations on astral planes and mythic realms, floating on pealing organ lines and stony synths".

In August 2009, Spin published a track-by-track review of Cosmic Egg, revealing the following song descriptions:

"California Queen" [...] From the first head-banging riff, to Andrew Stockdale's Ozzy-with-his-balls-in-a-vice vocals, to bongy, fantastic lyrics about "Standing in front of the rainbow" and "Homegrown hydroponics," Wolfmother still parties like it's backstage at a Uriah Heep show in 1972. [...] "White Feather" [...] Where the first two tracks leaned toward metal with their thick distortion and wailing vocals, "Feather" sits more towards the hard rock side of things. [...] "Sundial" A simple rocker. The song kicks off with a funky, Hendrix-y guitar lick and some one note piano plinking. [...] "Cosmic Egg" The bluesiest track so far. [...] "Far Away" [...] If "In the Morning" was power-ballad-as-psychedelic-rainbow, then "Far Away" is its prom-friendly cousin. [...] "Pilgrim" Very reminiscent of "Woman." [...] "Violence of the Sun" [...] A tense, mid-tempo keyboard part kicks things off. Guitar licks slither around a skittering hi-hat. [...] The bass doubles the guitar. [...] The drum rolls come fast and heavy. Stockdale's voice reaches into a higher register [...] through to the conclusion of this fittingly epic album closer.

== Release and promotion ==
After being tipped for a release in September, Cosmic Egg was confirmed as being due for release on 13 October 2009, possibly as a double album. Replying to a fan's query on Twitter, Stockdale confirmed that the album would "be [released] on vinyl with some beautiful artwork". The band announced that they would begin touring in November, as well as supporting fellow Australian hard rock band AC/DC at a number of dates on the Australia/New Zealand leg of their Black Ice World Tour, beginning in February 2010. The release date of 13 October was later confirmed to be that of the United States, while Japan (8 October), Germany, New Zealand (both 9 October), Europe (12 October) and the band's native Australia (also 9 October) would receive the album earlier.

In July 2009 it was announced that the band would be completing a national tour of Australia in September, the New Moon Rising Tour, prior to the release of Cosmic Egg, showcasing much of the new material. On 17 July Stockdale announced that the band would tour the United States before the end of 2009, in October or November; later in the day, he confirmed that Wolfmother would also visit the United Kingdom and Europe later in the year. It was later revealed that the band would be supporting American alternative rock band The Killers on the North American leg of their Day & Age Tour, prior to their Australian New Moon Rising Tour.

On 27 July the album was played in full at the newly opened Laserium CyberTheater in Hollywood, California. This was first hinted at by Stockdale on 22 July when he revealed that "Los Angeles – Your time has come. 7/27 is your chance to join in on a very exclusive Cosmic event"; a competition was later opened to allow 20 Wolfmother fans from Los Angeles to attend the event and "hear Cosmic Egg, in full and FIRST". The track listing was revealed by a fan and Laserium attendant the next day.

On the subject of music videos or a possible full movie companion to the album, Stockdale revealed that "We want to do a film clip for every song – just like a total visual thing for the whole record", adding that "I don't know if it'll be a linear thing where it has a script or anything like that but we'll definitely try to create some interesting footage to go with this record". On 10 August a Wolfmother blog on MySpace revealed that the first single from the album would be "New Moon Rising", available on 5 October worldwide. The news also came with the official revelation of the track listing, as well as information regarding album formats and release dates.

The artwork for Cosmic Egg was revealed on 12 August 2009. On 26 August a video was uploaded to the band's official YouTube page entitled "Transmissions From The COSMIC EGG – Episode 1", revealed to be "The first of a series of behind-the-scenes looks at the forthcoming Wolfmother opus" in which "Episode 1 travels the open high-way to Byron Bay where much of the record was born and pre-production took place". In September Cosmic Egg was delayed further "to allow [the band and management] more time to complete the artwork and manufacture the various release configurations". Throughout October 2009 the full album was available to listen to on the band's official MySpace page. On the Australian release date of the album, record label Modular Recordings declared 23 October to be "Official Cosmic Egg Day".

== Reception ==
Professional ratings
Aggregate scores
Source	Rating
Metacritic	65/100
Review scores
Source	Rating
AllMusic	3.5/5 stars
The A.V. Club	A−
Classic Rock	8/10 stars
The Fly	3/4 stars
The Guardian	2/5 stars
IGN	(8.9/10)
NME	(unfavourable)
PopMatters	(7/10)
Rock Sound	(8/10)
Rolling Stone	4/5 stars

According to the majority of pre-release reviews and interviews, Cosmic Egg was generally well received among music critics. Tiffany Bakker of Rolling Stone Australia magazine described the songs on the album as "vintage Wolfmother – heavy Sabbath-esque riffs and heaving basslines mixed with the distinctive wail of Andrew Stockdale that all add up to something raucous and thrilling". In another pre-release interview with Stockdale, music website Artistdirect summarised the album as "a powerful and poignant rock n' roll record with all the ingredients of a modern classic". Writer Rick Florino went on to describe specific strengths of the album, including "unforgettable riffs on 'Pilgrim' and 'Sun Dial'" and "the infectious hook on 'New Moon Rising'". Florino also identified "Pilgrim" as "lyrically [...] stand[ing] out", described "Sundial" as "like one of those crazy Black Sabbath stories" and outlined the bass performance as "pretty killer". MTV writer James Montgomery explained that "Cosmic Egg shouts very loudly, showcasing the added punch of three new musicians [...] and taking everything that made Wolfmother's self-titled debut such a smash – namely, gut-busting riffs, incendiary solos and bong-glazed mysticism – and cranking it to the absolute maximum". A review blog, CMK Music Review, stated that "While it may seem like it is nothing special, the simplicity of this album, combined with a constant force makes for a great combination". According to the Australian Recording Industry Association, in 2009 in Australia, Cosmic Egg was the 75th best-selling album and the 21st best-selling album by an Australian artist.

The album was nominated for the Classic Rock Album of the Year award in 2010, eventually losing to Slash's debut album, Slash.

== Track listing ==
All tracks are written by Andrew Stockdale, except where noted

Standard edition
No.	Title	Length
1.	"California Queen"	3:55
2.	"New Moon Rising"	3:46
3.	"White Feather"	3:04
4.	"Sundial"	3:48
5.	"In the Morning"	5:40
6.	"10,000 Feet"	4:09
7.	"Cosmic Egg"	4:04
8.	"Far Away"	4:00
9.	"Pilgrim"	4:50
10.	"In the Castle"	5:42
11.	"Phoenix"	4:45
12.	"Violence of the Sun"	6:02
Total length:		53:40

Australian digital download edition
No.	Title	Length
13.	"Sundial" (acoustic version)	3:53
14.	"Don't Let It Bring You Down" (written and originally performed by Neil Young)	3:06
15.	"Mannish Boy" (written by Muddy Waters, Mel London and Bo Diddley and originally performed by Waters)	8:32
Total length:		69:11

iTunes edition
No.	Title	Length
13.	"Cosmic Egg" (acoustic version)	4:28
Total length:		58:08

iTunes edition pre-order
No.	Title	Length
14.	"If 6 Was 9" (written by Jimi Hendrix and originally performed by The Jimi Hendrix Experience)	7:33
Total length:		65:41

Deluxe edition
No.	Title	Length
9.	"Cosmonaut"	4:48
10.	"Pilgrim"	4:50
11.	"Eyes Open"	5:11
12.	"Back Round"	3:56
13.	"In the Castle"	5:42
14.	"Caroline"	4:30
15.	"Phoenix"	4:45
16.	"Violence of the Sun"	6:02
Total length:		72:05

iTunes deluxe edition
No.	Title	Length
17.	"Cosmic Egg" (acoustic version)	4:28
Total length:		76:33

iTunes deluxe edition pre-order
No.	Title	Length
18.	"If 6 Was 9" (written by Jimi Hendrix and originally performed by The Jimi Hendrix Experience)	7:33
Total length:		84:06

Japanese edition
No.	Title	Length
10.	"Eyes Open"	5:11
11.	"Back Round"	3:56
12.	"In the Castle"	5:42
13.	"Phoenix"	4:45
14.	"Violence of the Sun"	6:02
15.	"Don't Let It Bring You Down" (written and originally performed by Neil Young)	3:06
16.	"Sundial" (acoustic version)	3:53
Total length:		69:47

Double vinyl edition
No.	Title	Length
1.	"California Queen"	3:54
2.	"Phoenix"	4:45
3.	"White Feather"	3:04
4.	"In the Morning"	5:39
5.	"10,000 Feet"	4:08
6.	"Caroline"	4:30
7.	"Eyes Open"	5:11
8.	"In the Castle"	5:42
9.	"Back Round"	3:56
10.	"Cosmic Egg"	4:04
11.	"New Moon Rising"	3:45
12.	"Cosmonaut"	4:48
13.	"Sundial"	3:47
14.	"Far Away"	4:00
15.	"Pilgrim"	4:50
16.	"Violence of the Sun"	6:02
Total length:		72:05

== Personnel ==
Wolfmother

- Andrew Stockdale – lead vocals, lead guitar, mixing
- Ian Peres – bass guitar, keyboards
- Aidan Nemeth – rhythm guitar
- Dave Atkins – drums, strings on "10,000 Feet"

Production personnel

- Alan Moulder – production, mixing
- Joe Barresi – engineering, mixing
- Morgan Stratton – engineering assistance
- Adam Fuller – engineering assistance
- Darren Lawson – additional mixing
- Henrik Michelsen – mixing assistance
- Justin Tressider – engineering on "Back Round"

Additional personnel

- Kenny Segal – strings on "10,000 Feet"
- Ben Tolliday – additional bass and engineering assistance on "Back Round"
- Invisible Creature – art direction
- Ryan Clark – graphic design
- Diego Ibanez – photography

== Charts ==
Chart (2009)	Peak position
Australian Albums Chart	3
Austrian Albums Chart	11
Dutch Albums Chart	14
Finnish Albums Chart	32
Irish Albums Chart	55
Japanese Albums Chart	218
New Zealand Albums Chart	24
Norwegian Albums Chart	15
Swiss Albums Chart	26
UK Albums Chart	35
Billboard 200	16

== Certifications ==
Region	Certification	Certified units/sales
Australia (ARIA)	Platinum	70,000^{^}
^{^} Shipments figures based on certification alone.

== Release history ==
Region	Date	Label	Format	Catalog	Notes
Japan	21 October 2009	Universal Music Japan	CD album	UICO-1172	Standard edition
Australia	23 October 2009	Modular Recordings	CD album	MODCD111	Standard edition
Australia	23 October 2009	Modular Recordings	CD album	MODCD112	Deluxe edition
Australia	23 October 2009	Modular Recordings	Double LP album		
United Kingdom	26 October 2009	Island Records	CD album		Standard edition
United Kingdom	26 October 2009	Island Records	CD album	2714011	Deluxe edition
United Kingdom	26 October 2009	Island Records	Double LP album		
United Kingdom	26 October 2009	N/A	Digital download album	N/A	Standard edition track listing
United States	27 October 2009	Interscope Records	CD album	BOO13365	Standard edition
United States	27 October 2009	Interscope Records	CD album	BOO13436	Deluxe edition
United States	27 October 2009	Interscope Records	Double LP album	001336501	
United States	27 October 2009	N/A	Digital download album	N/A	Standard edition track listing
United States	27 October 2009	N/A	Digital download album	N/A	Deluxe edition track listing

As well as those releases listed, Cosmic Egg was released as an iTunes digital download album available internationally. It was released in Austria, Belgium, Germany, Ireland, Italy, the Netherlands, Poland Switzerland on 23 October; Denmark on 26 October; Canada and Spain on 27 October; and Sweden on 28 October.
