= Take It or Leave It =

Take It or Leave It may refer to:

== Music ==
- "Take It or Leave It" (Cage the Elephant song)
- "Take It or Leave It" (Rolling Stones song)
- "Take It or Leave It", a song by Foghat from Fool for the City
- "Take It or Leave It", a song by Jet from Rare Tracks
- "Take It or Leave It", a song by Madness from Absolutely
- "Take It or Leave It", a song by Ted Nugent from State of Shock
- "Take It or Leave It", a song by The Runaways from Queens of Noise
- "Take It or Leave It", a song by Saga from Images at Twilight
- "Take It or Leave It", a song by Rae Sremmurd from SremmLife 2
- "Take It or Leave It", a song by The Strokes from Is This It
- "Take It or Leave It", a song by Sublime with Rome from Yours Truly
- Take It or Leave It, an album by Vengeance
- Take It or Leave It, an album by Bart Willoughby

== Other media ==
- Take It or Leave It (1944 film), a film directed by Benjamin Stoloff
- Take It or Leave It (1981 film), a 1981 documentary film about the band Madness
- Take It or Leave It (2018 film), a 2018 Estonian film
- Take It or Leave It (game show), a 2006–2008 UK game show
- Take It or Leave It (radio show), a 1940s CBS radio game show that evolved into The $64 Question

== See also ==
- "Take or Leave It" (Tom Robinson song), a 1980 song by the band Sector 27 on the album Sector 27; sometimes seen as "Take It or Leave It"
- Hobson's choice, a free choice between one option or nothing
