= Rare Tracks =

Rare Tracks may refer to:

- Rare Tracks (Jet album)
- Rare Tracks (Morrissey album)
- Rare Tracks (Sweetbox album)

== See also ==
- Rare Trax, a compilation album by Meshuggah
