= Back Round =

Single by Wolfmother

from the album Cosmic Egg
- Released: 26 May 2009
- Recorded: November–December 2008 in Byron Bay
- Genre: Hard rock, heavy metal, stoner rock
- Length: 3:56
- Label: Modular
- Songwriter: Andrew Stockdale
- Producer: Alan Moulder

Wolfmother singles chronology
"Joker & the Thief" (2006)	"Back Round" (2009)	"New Moon Rising" (2009)

"Back Round" is a song by Australian hard rock band Wolfmother. Written by vocalist and guitarist Andrew Stockdale, the song was the first material released since original band members Chris Ross and Myles Heskett left the band in August 2008. "Back Round" was originally released as a free digital download on the band's official website on 30 March 2009, and was later released as a downloadable single on iTunes on 26 May 2009. In October 2009 the song was featured on the deluxe edition of the band's second album, Cosmic Egg.

== History ==
"Back Round", originally entitled "Back Home", was written in September 2007, during a period of doubt surrounding the original incarnation of Wolfmother. Stockdale began recording some parts of the song and subsequently played it later in the year with drummer Dave Atkins, who joined the band as a full-time member in 2009. The song received its live debut, along with "The Violence of the Sun", "Monolith" and "Inside the Mountain", on 12 April 2008 when the band played their first gig in nine months at the Queensland Gallery of Modern Art. The song was then recorded in Los Angeles, California in August 2008, after the original band split up, but was subsequently re-recorded in a studio built under Stockdale's house in Australia between November and December, including some guitar parts on 12 December.

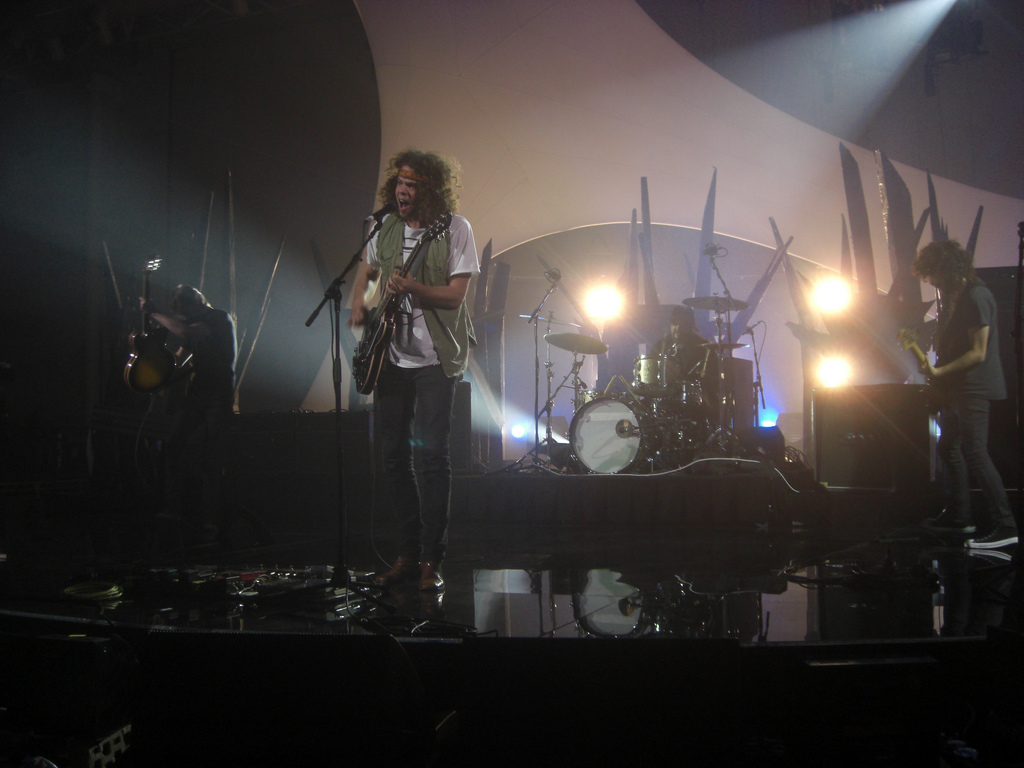
Wolfmother performing "Back Round" at the MTV Australia Awards 2009 on 27 March 2009.

Played at the two low-key comeback performances in Australia on 6 and 8 February, the song made its 'official' international live debut at the MTV Australia Awards 2009 on 27 March 2009, and was released for free on the band's official website shortly after. The song was also performed on 1 May at the Natural History Museum of Los Angeles County, the new lineup's first performance outside of Australia, where new songs "Cosmic Egg" and "California Queen" were premièred. "Back Round" was featured on the music video game Guitar Hero 5 as a playable track in September 2009, and was made available for free download from the game's official website.

Outside of Australia, "Back Round" was also released as a downloadable single in Belgium, Denmark, Finland, France, Germany, Italy, Japan, the Netherlands, New Zealand, Norway, Portugal, Spain, Sweden, Switzerland, and the United Kingdom.

== Style and reception ==
With regards to the style of the song, music magazine Billboard described "Back Round" as "swimming in chunky guitar licks and drum fills". Rinjo Njori of music blog Earvolution.com likened the song to the band's older material, claiming it holds up well next to "Woman", and compared it to the work of Cream, Black Sabbath and Soundgarden. Independent website Altsounds.com introduced the song as a "rollicking behemoth of timeless rock n roll", going on to praise it as "A liberating avalanche of skull-crushing drums and primal riffing [...] a joyous evolution for the Australian band"; while American newspaper The Herald was equally optimistic, suggesting that "The new lineup sounds ready to deliver the goods based on 'Back Round'". Though already released for free, the track was a minor commercial success, charting at number 100 on the Australian ARIA Singles Chart.

== Music video ==
A music video for "Back Round" was recorded on 24 July 2009. Stockdale uploaded two stills from the videoshoot on his Twitter profile, claiming that the "Clip [would] be out soon". As of the release of Cosmic Egg, however, a music video has still not been released; the release of videos for subsequent singles "New Moon Rising", "White Feather" and "Far Away" suggests that the idea has since been set aside.

== Personnel ==
Musical personnel

- Andrew Stockdale – vocals, guitar, bass guitar
- Dave Atkins – drums
- Ben Tolliday – additional bass, engineering assistance

Production personnel

- Alan Moulder – mixing
- Justin Tresidder – engineering
- Joe Malone – technical assistance

== Charts ==
Chart performance for "Back Round"
Chart (2009)	Peak position
Australia (ARIA)	100
