= Ever We Fall =

- Origin: Portland, Oregon, United States
- Genres: Alternative rock; indie rock; post-hardcore (early)
- Years active: 2000-2008
- Labels: Rise; Hopeless; Bad News
- Website: everwefall.com

Ever We Fall was an American alternative rock band from Portland, Oregon.

== History ==
Ever We Fall was formed in Portland in the early 2000s, and signed to Rise Records in 2003 to release their first EP, Endura. While touring the U.S. in support of the album, their bass guitarist left the group, and the band finished the tour as a trio with guitarist Ryan Furlott taking over on bass guitar. In 2004, the group signed with Hopeless Records. The band appeared at the South by Southwest music conference in March 2005 as part of a Hopeless Records showcase. They went on a Canadian tour with Kaddisfly in July 2005. In November 2005, We Are But Human was announced for release the following year; it appeared on February 21, 2006. Between March and May 2006, they embarked on a cross-country tour of the US.

Ever We Fall has toured with groups including Kaddisfly, Small Towns Burn A Little Slower and Life Before This.

The song "Youth Like Tigers" was featured on the Teenage Mutant Ninja Turtles soundtrack in March 2007.

During July 2008, the band officially announced on their MySpace page that they had broken up and had no intention to reunite.

== Members ==
Final members at break-up

- Adam Brazie - vocals, guitar
- Ryan Furlott - guitar (bass guitar during the later half of their Rise Records tour)
- Matthew Szklarz - drums

Former members

- Ian Fike - bass guitar (now the vocalist of Portland group It Prevails)
- Ben Klenz - bass guitar (recorded with the group on Endura)
- Jay Turk - bass guitar (with the band from 2005 to 2006, recorded with the group on We Are But Human)
- Aaron James - bass guitar (with the band during their 2006-2007 tour across the US)

== Discography ==
- Endura (Rise Records, 2004)
- We Are But Human (Hopeless Records, 2006)
