= New Moon Rising (song) =

Single by Wolfmother

from the album Cosmic Egg
- Released: 25 August 2009 (release history)
- Length: 3:43
- Label: Modular
- Songwriter: Andrew Stockdale
- Producer: Alan Moulder

Wolfmother singles chronology
| "Back Round" (2009) | "New Moon Rising" (2009) | "White Feather" (2009) |

"New Moon Rising" is a song by Australian hard rock band Wolfmother. It was released on their second studio album Cosmic Egg, released in 2009. The song shares its name with an Australian concert tour by the band, the New Moon Rising Tour, and was released as the lead single from the album on 25 August 2009. According to the Australian Recording Industry Association, in 2009 in Australia, "New Moon Rising" was the 49th best-selling single by an Australian artist.

== Background and composition ==
The phrase "New Moon Rising" was first revealed as Wolfmother-related in July 2009, when the band's New Moon Rising Tour was announced. As a song, "New Moon Rising" was first revealed as part of Cosmic Egg's track listing following a listening party in the United States in late-July, where it was shown to be positioned third between "California Queen" and "White Feather". When the album's track listing was officially revealed in August, the song was shown to be positioned second – preceded and succeeded by the same tracks – due to the omission of opening track "Back Round". The song received its first radio play on Australian network Triple J on 13 August 2009, described as "a thumping, ripping slice of optimistic future-blues." It will be released as a single on 5 October, followed by the album in the succeeding weeks. The song was uploaded to the band's official MySpace page on 17 August 2009.

Canadian radio station The Edge revealed, according to an interview with lead vocalist and guitarist Andrew Stockdale, that the song "was inspired by some very odd encounters he had after work," quoting him as saying the following:

When I'd drive home, like at the end of the night, I'd see all these like native animals that I'd never seen in my entire life. Like, I was driving along and in the middle of the road was this four-foot-high koala. And I've never seen a koala! Another night I saw an animal with spikes all over it. So it was kind of bizarre, like, around the time of "New Moon Rising," I saw a lot of, like, wildlife that people even in that town said they'd never seen their whole life.

The song was used in an episode of The World's Strictest Parents. The song was also featured in the trailer for Due Date starring Robert Downey Jr. and Zach Galifianakis

== Style and influences ==
In a pre-release review of the album, American music magazine Spin offered the following background and description of "New Moon Rising":

The lyrics for this track were handed out to all the guests at the listening party, so I guess we're supposed to take them as some sort of statement of intent. In which case, the lines "Well he's scared of the people / He don't wanna be the whipping boy / But the time has come now / Gotta hit that highway" reads like Stockdale's coming to terms with continuing the band. A very Queens of the Stone Age-y low-string guitar riff fuels this one, which also features some nice unaccompanied drum breaks.

== Music video ==
The music video for "New Moon Rising" premiered on MTV Australia on 13 October 2009.

== Track listing ==
All songs written by Andrew Stockdale.

Australia CD single (MODCDS069)

1. "New Moon Rising" – 3:46
2. "New Moon Rising" (YACHT remix) – 4:45
3. "New Moon Rising" (Riton Vocal Rub) – 5:06
4. "Back Round" (acoustic) – 4:21

United Kingdom 12" picture disc (MODVL121)

1. "New Moon Rising" – 3:46
2. "New Moon Rising" (YACHT remix) – 4:45
3. "New Moon Rising" (Riton Vocal Rub) – 5:06
4. "New Moon Rising" (Riton Club Rub) – 5:40

Digital download single

1. "New Moon Rising" – 3:45

iTunes digital download EP

1. "New Moon Rising" – 3:46
2. "New Moon Rising" (YACHT remix) – 4:45
3. "New Moon Rising" (Riton Vocal Rub) – 5:06
4. "New Moon Rising" (Riton Club Rub) – 5:40
5. "New Moon Rising" (Fontan version) – 5:53
6. "Back Round" (acoustic) – 4:21

== Charts ==
| Chart (2009) | Peak |
|---|---|
| Canada Rock (Billboard) | 16 |
| Billboard Alternative Songs | 38 |
| ARIA Top 50 Singles | 50 |

== Release history ==
"New Moon Rising" was released as a digital download-only single in August 2009 internationally; the specific dates were as follows: 21 August in Ireland; 24 August in Kuwait, Argentina, Austria, Belgium, Bosnia, Bulgaria, Croatia, Czech Republic, Denmark, Estonia, Finland, Hong Kong, Hungary, India, Iraq, Israel, Italy, Japan, Jordan, Qatar, Latvia, Lebanon, Lithuania, Luxembourg, Macedonia, Malaysia, Montenegro, Netherlands, New Zealand, Norway, Oman, the Philippines, Poland, Romania, Russia, Saudi Arabia, Serbia, Singapore, Slovakia, Slovenia, South Africa, Sweden, the Syrian Arab Republic, Thailand, Tunisia, Turkey, the United Kingdom, Ukraine, the United Arab Emirates and Yemen; 25 August in Australia, Canada, China, Iceland, Portugal, Taiwan and the United States; and 28 August in Brazil, Chile, Colombia, Germany, Greece, South Korea, Spain, Switzerland and Venezuela. A CD single was also released in Australia, and a 12" picture disc was issued in the UK.
