= Bring It On Back =

Single by Jet

from the album Shine On
- Released: 20 November 2006 (UK); 9 June 2007 (AUS)
- Recorded: Barbados, Summer 2006
- Genre: Alternative rock
- Length: 4:09
- Label: Atlantic
- Songwriter(s): Nic Cester, Chris Cester
- Producer(s): Dave Sardy

Jet singles chronology
"Put Your Money Where Your Mouth Is" (2006)	"Bring It On Back" (2006)	"Rip It Up" (2006)

"Bring It On Back" is a song by Australian rock band Jet, and is the fourth track on their second album Shine On. It was released 20 November 2006 as the second single from that album in the UK (see 2006 in British music). A music video was made for the single; it depicts Nic Cester in a relationship with a girl. There was a possibility that the single could receive a worldwide release outside of UK, Europe and Australia, although this never eventuated. "Bring It On Back" was used between February and August in advertisements for the 2007 AFL Season on Channel 10 in Australia to promote the return of Saturday Night Football to 10. It was released on iTunes as the fourth single in Australia on 9 June 2007. The song failed to chart in Australia.

== Track listing ==
- 7" blue vinyl AT0263
1. "Bring It On Back"
2. "I Only Like You When I'm High"
- 7" picture disc AT0263X
1. "Bring It On Back"
2. "Where Are All My Good Friends?"
- CD AT0263CD
1. "Bring It On Back"
2. "Jane Jones" (Recorded in Barbados)
