= Seventeen (Jet song) =

Single by Jet

from the album Shaka Rock
- Released: August 2009
- Recorded: 2008
- Genre: Hard rock, alternative rock
- Length: 3:41
- Label: Warner Music, Atlantic Records
- Songwriter(s): N. Cester, C. Cester, Muncey

Jet singles chronology
"Black Hearts (On Fire)" (2009)	"Seventeen" (2009)

"Seventeen" is a song by Australian rock band Jet and is the third single taken from their third album Shaka Rock. The song has received heavy airplay throughout Australia and has gone on to become the second highest-charting single from Shaka Rock and their second top 40 ARIA Singles Chart hit from the album. The single initially entered the chart at #40 but managed to rise up to #31 in its 5th week. A music video has been filmed for the single.

== Track listing ==
iTunes single
No.	Title	Length
1.	"Seventeen"	3:41
2.	"Seventeen (feat. Nicole Atkins)"	4:20

== Chart positions ==
Chart (2009)	Peak position	
ARIA Singles Chart	31	AUS: Gold

== Awards and nominations ==
=== APRA Awards ===
The APRA Awards are presented annually from 1982 by the Australasian Performing Right Association (APRA).

Year	Nominee / work	Award	Result
2011	"Seventeen" – Nicholas Cester, Christopher Cester, Cameron Muncey	Most Played Australian Work	Won
2011	"Seventeen" – Nicholas Cester, Christopher Cester, Cameron Muncey	Rock Work of the Year	Won
