= She's a Genius =

2009 single by Jet

Single by Jet

from the album Shaka Rock
- Released: 22 June 2009
- Recorded: 2008
- Genre: Hard rock
- Length: 2:58
- Label: Warner Music, Atlantic Records
- Songwriter: Chris Cester

Jet singles chronology
"The Wild One" (2008)	"She's a Genius" (2009)	"Black Hearts (On Fire)" (2009)

"She's a Genius" is a song by Australian rock band Jet. It was released as the lead single from the band's third album Shaka Rock. The song was played at a secret show in Melbourne in November 2008 and was announced as the first single along with the album title and album artwork in April 2009.

It was also played live as part of their set at the Melbourne and Sydney Sound Relief concerts for the victims of the Black Saturday bushfires in March 2009.

Subsequently, it was made available as a free playable track in the iPhone OS game Tap Tap Revenge 2 and on 25 August, as a downloadable song for Rock Band.

The song made an appearance on the TV show NCIS in the episode Reunion. The song was also played on the Australian countdown TV show 20 to 1. The chorus was used in RTÉ's National Lottery advertisements.

The single has been certified Gold in Australia for more than 35,000 shipments.

== Track listing ==
All tracks are written by Jet.

iTunes single
No.	Title	Length
1.	"She's a Genius"	2:58
Total length:		2:58

iTunes EP
No.	Title	Length
1.	"She's a Genius"	2:58
2.	"One Hipster One Bullit"	2:12
3.	"Everything Will Be Alright"	2:54

All tracks are written by Jet.

iTunes single
No.	Title	Length
1.	"She's a Genius"	2:58
Total length:		2:58

DJ Promo Single
No.	Title	Length
1.	"She's a Genius"	2:58
2.	"She's a Genius (Laid Back Version)"	2:58
3.	"She's a Genius (Acoustic Version)"	2:54
4.	"She's a Genius (Instrumental Version)"	2:58

== Charts ==
=== Weekly charts ===
Chart (2009)	Peak position
Australia (ARIA)	20
Canada Hot 100 (Billboard)	59
Canada Rock (Billboard)	48
New Zealand (Recorded Music NZ)	18
Switzerland Airplay (Schweizer Hitparade)	96
US Hot Rock & Alternative Songs (Billboard)	21

=== Year-end charts ===
Chart (2009)	Position
Australia (ARIA)	85
Japan Adult Contemporary (Billboard)	46

== Certifications ==
Region	Certification	Certified units/sales
Australia (ARIA)	Gold	35,000^{^}
^{^} Shipments figures based on certification alone.
