= Black Hearts (On Fire) =

Single by Jet

from the album Shaka Rock
- Released: October 2009
- Recorded: 2008
- Genre: Hard rock, alternative rock
- Length: 3:14
- Label: Warner Music, Atlantic Records
- Songwriters: Chris Cester & Cam Muncey

Jet singles chronology
"She's a Genius" (2009)	"Black Hearts (On Fire)" (2009)	"Seventeen" (2010)

"Black Hearts (On Fire)" is a song by Australian rock band Jet and is the second single taken from their third album Shaka Rock. Like She's a Genius which was the first single from the album, the song debuted at a secret show in Melbourne in November 2008 and was later included as a track on the album. The single was released on iTunes on 2 November.

== Track listing ==
iTunes single
No.	Title	Length
1.	"Black Hearts (On Fire)"	3:13
2.	"Seventeen (Acoustic)"	3:49

DJ Promo single
No.	Title	Length
1.	"Black Hearts (On Fire) [Radio Edit]"	3:15
2.	"Black Hearts (On Fire)"	3:13
3.	"Black Hearts (On Fire) [Instrumental]"	3:14

== Chart positions ==
Chart (2009)	Peak position
Poland (LP3)	49
U.S. Hot Mainstream Rock Tracks	32

== In popular culture ==
The song was featured in an episode of the first season of the TV show The Vampire Diaries.

The song was also featured in the Australian film 'Tomorrow, When The War Began'
