= Stand Up (Jet song) =

Song by Jet

from the album Shine On
- Released: December 2006
- Recorded: Summer 2006
- Studio: Barbados
- Genre: Hard rock
- Label: EMI/destra Media; Atlantic; Capitol
- Songwriter(s): Nic Cester; Chris Cester
- Producer(s): Dave Sardy

"Stand Up" is a song by Australian rock band, Jet, from their second album, Shine On (September 2006). It was the fourth single off the album, with a live music video filmed during a show on the Yarra River. It was released as a single in December 2006 and charted at No. 22 on the Billboard Mainstream Rock chart. The song was used in commercials on the Discovery Channel for the highlights of 2007 and in a film The Comebacks.
