= TMNT: Teenage Mutant Ninja Turtles (soundtrack) =

TMNT: Teenage Mutant Ninja Turtles (Music from the Motion Picture)

Soundtrack album by Klaus Badelt
- Released: March 20, 2007
- Genres: Soundtrack; Pop punk Emo
- Length: 45:22
- Label: Atlantic
- Producers: Kevin Weaver; Sharon Cohen

Professional ratings
Review scores
Source	Rating
Allmusic	2.5/5 stars

TMNT: Teenage Mutant Ninja Turtles (Music from the Motion Picture) is the licensed soundtrack to the 2007 Warner Bros. film TMNT. It was released by Atlantic Records on March 20, 2007.

== Album information ==
Unlike its predecessor soundtracks from 1990, 1991, and 1993 which featured overall hip hop and techno themes, this collection features a pop punk and emo theme. Keeping in the tradition it features two score cues from the film by composer Klaus Badelt.

== Track listings ==
No.	Title	Artist	Length
1.	"Shell Shock"	Gym Class Heroes	3:16
2.	"Rip It Up"	Jet	3:19
3.	"There's a Class for This"	Cute Is What We Aim For	3:36
4.	"Awww Dip"	Cobra Starship	2:56
5.	"Roses"	Meg & Dia	3:28
6.	"Bring Me Along"	Pepper	3:32
7.	"Fall Back Into My Life"	Amber Pacific	3:35
8.	"Red Flag"	Billy Talent	3:16
9.	"Walking on Water"	This Providence	2:36
10.	"Youth Like Tigers"	Ever We Fall	2:43
11.	"Lights Out" (Chris Vrenna Remix)	P.O.D.	2:56
12.	"Black Betty"	Big City Rock	3:31
13.	"I Love Being A Turtle" (Score)	Klaus Badelt	3:05
14.	"Nightwatcher" (Score)	Klaus Badelt	3:00
