= Shine On (Jet album) =

Studio album by Jet
- Released: 30 September 2006
- Recorded: 2006
- Studios: Barbados; Massachusetts; Los Angeles, California
- Genres: Hard rock; alternative rock
- Length: 48:26
- Labels: Atlantic; Capitol
- Producer: Dave Sardy

Jet chronology
Rare Tracks (2004)	Shine On (2006)	Shaka Rock (2009)

Singles from Shine On
- 1. "Put Your Money Where Your Mouth Is" Released: 18 September 2006; 2. "Bring It On Back" Released: 20 November 2006 (UK) 6 September 2007 (AUS); 3. "Shine On" Released: 7 November 2006; 4. "Rip It Up" Released: 27 November 2006

Shine On is the second album by Australian rock band Jet, released on 30 September 2006 in Australia and internationally on 2–3 October 2006.

The iTunes Store leaked the album in the Australian and United Kingdom stores on 16 September 2006, two weeks before the official release date. After iTunes leaked the album, Shine On made its way onto file sharing sites through forums of similar bands and people shared that information on Jet's MySpace page.

On 23 September 2006, Triple J premiered the album on its Music Specials show along with interviews with the band. A day later, Nova 100 played the entire album on the radio as a preview.

== History ==
NME first reported in June 2006 that the tracks "L'Esprit d'Escalier", "Holiday", "Hey Kids" (for the US version only), "Shiny Magazine", "Eleanor", and "All You Have to Do" were set to appear on the album. "Hey Kids" was released on the Elektra soundtrack but the band liked it so much, they revived it for this album. "Rip It Up" was originally titled "Nothing to Lose", and images of the work in progress lyrics can be viewed in the "Shine On" teaser video that was released in August 2006, along with lyrics for "Don't Worry Baby".

Australian newspaper Herald Sun described the following tracks prior to the release of Shine On:

- "All You Have to Do":
  The album will open and close with a track currently titled "All You Have to Do". It was a difficult song to finish because we were trying to find the answer to the question and everything sounded cheesy.
- "Eleanor": "Eleanor" sounds like it's from the '40s.
- "King's Horses": There's one track, "King's Horses", which is this nursery rhyme which talks a bit about the bitterness we felt over the past two years.
- "Shiny Magazines": And there's "Shiny Magazines" which has the Phil Spector vibe.
- "Shine On": The song "Shine On" was written by Nic to comfort his family after his father's death. "It was inevitable I would write a song that dealt with all of that, but it was almost too big a subject for me to handle", Nic says. "Then I got a phone call from my mum saying everyone was fucked so I wrote the song through Dad's eyes, what he would say to help everyone through. We recorded it in one take, but it was fucking emotional, very heavy. We couldn't be happier with this album".

== Reception ==
Professional ratings
Aggregate scores
Source	Rating
Metacritic	62/100
Review scores
Source	Rating
AllMusic	3.5/5 stars
The Guardian	3/5 stars
NME	7/10
Okayplayer	3.5/5 stars
Pitchfork	0.0/10
Q	4/5 stars
Rolling Stone	3/5 stars
Spin	2.5/5 stars
Sputnikmusic	2.5/5

The album debuted at No. 3 on the Australian ARIA Albums chart the week of 8 October 2006 and became the fiftieth-highest selling album for 2006, and was certified platinum (70,000 units shipped). It also debuted and peaked at No. 13 on the Official UK Top 75 Albums Chart and No. 16 on the Billboard 200, but quickly fell out of the top 100 within four weeks.

As of 2007, the album has sold 137,000 copies in the United States. As of 2012, Shine On and Shaka Rock have sold 212,000 copies combined in the United States.

Critical reaction to the album was mixed. British music magazine NME, for instance, called the record "another joyfully old-fashioned rock 'n' roll album immersed in the classics", while AllMusic gave the album 3.5 stars out of 5 as a solid if undistinguished second effort.

The American review site Pitchfork posted a review containing only a video clip of a chimpanzee urinating into its own mouth, along with a score of 0.0 out 10. The review was widely shared and helped popularise Pitchfork.

In 2024, the Pitchfork editor Scott Plagenhoef said the writers had felt that Shine On represented the way rock music had "curdled into a set of lazy signifiers and posers". He said: "Progression—whether it was in hip-hop, pop, guitar music, electronic music—was important to us at the time. Seeing mainstream rock music, which of course most of us had grown up with a fondness for, become so knuckle-dragging and Xeroxed was disappointing." They felt it would be a waste of time to write a conventional review, and so conceived something "metaphorical and dismissive" and site editors attributed the non-review to collective pseudonym "Ray Suzuki".

== "Shine On" (song) ==
"Shine On"

Single by Jet

from the album Shine On
- B-side: "Coming Home Soon"
- Released: 7 November 2006
- Recorded: Barbados, Summer 2006
- Genre: Soft rock
- Length: 4:36
- Label: Atlantic, Capitol Records (Australia)
- Songwriter: Nic Cester
- Producer: Dave Sardy

Jet singles chronology
"Rip It Up" (2006)	"Shine On" (2006)	"I Spy I Spy" (2007)

"Shine On" is a song by Australian rock band Jet, and the third single from their second album, Shine On. The single was released in Australia on 7 November 2006. A digital EP was released to the American iTunes Store in December 2006. It was subsequently released as a CD and 7" vinyl single in the United Kingdom on 5 March 2007.

"Shine On" peaked at number 54 on the Australian singles chart (number 40 on the Australian physical singles chart); number 47 on the Scottish singles chart, and number 114 on the UK singles chart. The song also charted in the United States reaching number 30 on the Modern Rock chart.

The song was written by Nic Cester to comfort his family after his father's death. He is quoted as saying: "It was inevitable I would write a song that dealt with all of that, but it was almost too big a subject for me to handle. Then I got a phone call from my mum saying everyone was depressed so I wrote the song through Dad's eyes, what he would say to help everyone through. We recorded it in one take, but it was emotional, very heavy." Cester in an interview with the Los Angeles Times went on to state, "Shine On, is a song I wrote from Dad’s perspective. It’s like his words to us, to our family." Bernard Zuel, in the Sydney Morning Herald, stated that the song "takes its cues from McCartney's Let It Be ballads, choirs and all, daring you to mock the genuine emotion.

The title of the song is in homage to "Shine On You Crazy Diamond", a similarly themed song by Pink Floyd. Similarly, the refrain of "Shine on, for everyone" is reminiscent of "Instant Karma!", a song by John Lennon.

The song was featured in the final episode of the television series The O.C., and also in the final episode of season four of Cold Case. The song was also in a first-season episode of Brothers & Sisters.

The band performed the song at the Sydney Sound Relief concert in 2009.

In 2008 the song featured in the tribute to Fred Hollows and in the Fred Hollows Foundation advertisement on Australian television. In 2009 the advert went on to win a Gold Star Award for 'best non-profit video advertisement' at the 29th International Fundraising Congress, held in the Netherlands.

=== Release details ===
Year	Date	Format	Country	Label	Catalogue no.
2006	7 November	CD	AUS	Capitol	0946 3 88725 2 8
2006	12 December	Digital (iTunes)	US	Atlantic	-
2006	-	CD (Promo)	US	Atlantic	PRCD302415
2007	-	CD (Promo)	UK	Atlantic	PR016131
2007	3 March	Digital (iTunes)	AUS	Capitol	-
2007	5 March	7" single	UK	Atlantic	AT0270X
2007	5 March	CD	UK	Atlantic	AT0270CD

== Track listing ==
Album:

Shine On track listing
No.	Title	Writer(s)	Length
1.	"L'Esprit d'Escalier"	Chris Cester, Nic Cester, Cameron Muncey	0:23
2.	"Holiday"	Chris Cester, Nic Cester, Cameron Muncey	3:25
3.	"Put Your Money Where Your Mouth Is"	Chris Cester, Nic Cester, Cameron Muncey	2:32
4.	"Bring It On Back"	Nic Cester	4:09
5.	"That's All Lies"	Chris Cester, Nic Cester, Cameron Muncey	2:43
6.	"Hey Kids" (re-recorded version) (included on North American and Japanese versions only)	Chris Cester, Nic Cester, Cameron Muncey	3:14
7.	"Kings Horses"	Nic Cester, Chris Cester	3:20
8.	"Shine On"	Nic Cester	4:36
9.	"Come on Come On"	Nic Cester, Chris Cester, Cameron Muncey	4:24
10.	"Stand Up"	Nic Cester, Chris Cester	4:33
11.	"Rip It Up"	Chris Cester, Nic Cester	3:19
12.	"Skin and Bones"	Chris Cester, Steve Hesketh	3:17
13.	"Shiny Magazine"	Chris Cester, Nic Cester	3:28
14.	"Eleanor"	Chris Cester, Nic Cester	3:34
15.	"All You Have to Do"	Chris Cester, Nic Cester, Cameron Muncey	4:38

=== Shine On single tracks ===
==== Australian versions ====
- CD/iTunes
1. "Shine On" (radio edit) – 3:43
2. "Coming Home Soon" – 4:23
3. "The Only Place That's Up from Here Is Down" (demo) – 3:09
4. "Eleanor" (full band version) – 3:33
5. "Shine On" (album version) – 4:36

==== British versions ====
- Promo CD
1. "Shine On" – 3:43
- 7"
1. "Shine On" – 3:43
2. "Eleanor" (full band version) – 3:33
- CD
1. "Shine On" – 3:43
2. "Coming Home Soon" – 4:23

==== American versions ====
- Promo CD
1. "Shine On" (radio edit) – 3:43
2. "Shine On" (album version) – 4:38
- iTunes EP
1. "Shine On" – 4:36
2. "Where Are All My Good Friends" – 3:37
3. "Jane Jones" – 2:53

== Charts ==
Chart performance for Shine On
Chart (2006)	Peak position
Australian Albums (ARIA)	3
Austrian Albums (Ö3 Austria)	34
Canadian Albums (Nielsen SoundScan)	18
European Albums (Billboard)	26
French Albums (SNEP)	140
German Albums (Offizielle Top 100)	47
Irish Albums (IRMA)	57
Italian Albums (FIMI)	33
Japanese Albums (Oricon)	7
New Zealand Albums (RMNZ)	35
Scottish Albums (Official Charts)	12
Spanish Albums (Promusicae)	76
Swiss Albums (Schweizer Hitparade)	30
UK Albums (Official Charts)	13
US Billboard 200	16
US Indie Store Album Sales (Billboard)	10
US Top Rock Albums (Billboard)	7

== Certifications ==
Certifications for Shine On
Region	Certification	Certified units/sales
Australia (ARIA)	Platinum	70,000^{^}
United Kingdom (BPI)	Gold	100,000^{^}
^{^} Shipments figures based on certification alone.
