= Shaka Rock =

Studio album by Jet
- Released: 19 August 2009
- Recorded: October 2008 – April 2009
- Studio: Los Angeles, California
- Genre: Hard rock
- Length: 40:50
- Label: Real Horrorshow; Five Seven; EMI; Tenth Street
- Producer: Jet; Chris "Frenchie" Smith

Jet chronology
Shine On (2006)	Shaka Rock (2009)	Get Born Live (2018)

Singles from Shaka Rock
- 1. "She's a Genius" Released: 22 June 2009; 2. "Black Hearts (On Fire)" Released: September 2009; 3. "Seventeen" Released: April 2010

Shaka Rock is the third studio album by Australian rock band Jet, released on 21 August 2009.

== History ==
The band began working on the album in 2008. After touring was completed for their previous album, Shine On, the band took a short break. The album was originally thought to be released in late 2008 but a secret show was played in Melbourne in December 2008 only to debut new material. Various tracks from the album were played at this concert, including the first single "She's a Genius". In an interview with MTV's Ruby Rose on Channel 10's 7PM Project, it was said two unnamed tracks were recorded in Australia, one in Melbourne and one in Sydney. The album was posted on 20 August 2009 on the band's MySpace page.

The track "K.I.A (Killed in Action)" was added to Jet's website in early April 2009. Altsounds.com first reported on the album in late April 2009—drawing on information from the leaked press kit and providing the image of the album cover.

== Reception ==
Professional ratings
Aggregate scores
Source	Rating
Metacritic	51/100
Review scores
Source	Rating
The Age	3/5 stars
AllMusic	2/5 stars
Billboard	(favourable)
The Boston Globe	(favorable)
Los Angeles Times	(mixed)
Mojo	2/5 stars
Q	4/5 stars
Rolling Stone	2/5 stars
Spin	6/10 stars
Uncut	2/5 stars

Shaka Rock was met with "mixed or average" reviews from critics. At Metacritic, which assigns a weighted average rating out of 100 to reviews from mainstream publications, this release received an average score of 51 based on 9 reviews.

Q rated "K.I.A" in the Q50 for September 2009 and the album as a whole fell just outside the magazine's best fifty albums of the year. The record has been made Entertainment Weekly Picks of The Week for 23 August.

== Track listing ==
Shaka Rock track listing
No.	Title	Writer(s)	Length
1.	"K.I.A. (Killed in Action)"	C. Cester	3:31
2.	"Beat on Repeat"	N. Cester, C. Cester	2:32
3.	"She's a Genius"	C. Cester	3:01
4.	"Black Hearts (On Fire)"	C. Cester, Muncey	3:14
5.	"Seventeen"	N. Cester, C. Cester, Muncey	3:41
6.	"La Di Da"	N. Cester	2:55
7.	"Goodbye Hollywood"	N. Cester	4:13
8.	"Walk"	C. Cester, Muncey	3:07
9.	"Times Like This"	N. Cester, Muncey, Wilson, C. Cester	3:22
10.	"Let Me Out"	N. Cester	3:12
11.	"Start the Show"	Muncey, Wilson	3:59
12.	"She Holds a Grudge"	N. Cester, Muncey	4:17

Japanese bonus tracks
No.	Title	Length
13.	"Don't Break Me Down"	3:35
14.	"Everything Will Be Alright"	2:54

Vinyl bonus track
No.	Title	Length
13.	"One Hipster One Bullit"	2:12

iTunes bonus tracks
No.	Title	Length
13.	"Look What You've Done" (iTunes Originals version)	3:54
14.	"Are You Gonna Be My Girl?" (iTunes Originals version)	3:34
15.	"Never Tear Us Apart" (INXS acoustic cover; pre-order only)	3:17

== Personnel ==
Jet

- Chris Cester – drums, percussion (1–6, 8, 9, 11), vocals (1, 2, 8), backing vocals (5, 7, 9), samples (1), smashing glass (8)
- Nic Cester – vocals (1–11), guitar (1–5, 7–12), percussion (2, 6, 7), backing vocals (6, 12), acoustic guitar (6, 8), fuzz guitar (6), Arp keys (7), wah-wah (11)
- Cameron Muncey – guitar (1–11), backing vocals (2, 5, 7, 8, 9, 11), 12-string guitar (7), vibraphone (11), lead vocals (12), slide guitar (12), Acoustic Guitar (12)
- Mark Wilson – bass (1–7, 9–12), samples (2, 3), backing vocals (2, 9), synthesizer (4, 5), piano (5, 12), fuzz bass (8)

=== Additional musicians ===
- Chris Smith – guitar (1, 3, 12), Hammond M1 (7), tremolo guitar (7), backing vocals (9)
- Troupe Gammage – piano (5, 6, 8)
- Brooks Johnson – vocals (1)
- Ella Stovall – vocals (1)
- Josie Johnson – vocals (1)
- Theo Tolan – vocals (1)
- Samantha May – vocals (1)
- Caroline Pollan – vocals (1)
- Hanna Rimel – vocals (1)
- Asia Biddle – vocals (1)
- Matthew Beck – vocals (1)
- Drew Eno – vocals (1)
- Meimei Graber – vocals (1)
- Alex Clark – vocals (1)
- John Clark – vocals (1)
- Madelyn Rimel – vocals (1)
- Lane Loudamy – vocals (1)
- Jonathan Shim – snare drum (1)
- Rannon Ching – snare drum (1)
- Blake Brunson – bass drum (1)
- Jeremy Burchard – tenor drums (1)
- James King – saxophone (3)
- Ian McLagan – Hammond B3 (7)
- Georgia Gutjahr – backing vocals (9)
- Allie Freeland – backing vocals (9)
- Clea Freeland – backing vocals (9)
- Louis Macklin – piano (10)
- Lukas Haas – Rhodes piano (12)

== Charts ==
Chart (2009)	Peak position
Australian Albums (ARIA)	5
Austrian Albums (Ö3 Austria)	38
Canadian Albums (Nielsen SoundScan)	34
French Albums (SNEP)	135
German Albums (Offizielle Top 100)	59
Japanese Albums (Oricon)	12
New Zealand Albums (RMNZ)	22
Scottish Albums (OCC)	46
Swiss Albums (Schweizer Hitparade)	15
UK Albums (OCC)	53
US Billboard 200	27
US Indie Store Album Sales (Billboard)	11
US Top Alternative Albums (Billboard)	9
US Top Rock Albums (Billboard)	11

== Certifications ==
Region	Certification	Certified units/sales
Australia (ARIA)	Platinum	70,000^{‡}
New Zealand (RMNZ)	Gold	7,500^{‡}
^{‡} Sales+streaming figures based on certification alone.

== Release history ==
Region	Date	Label
Japan	19 August 2009	EMI
Australia	21 August 2009	EMI
United States	25 August 2009	EMI
United Kingdom	7 September 2009	EMI
Brazil	8 September 2009	EMI
