= Far Away (Wolfmother song) =

Single by Wolfmother

from the album Cosmic Egg
- B-side: "Wuthering Heights" (live)
- Released: 3 June 2010
- Genre: Hard rock, stoner rock, neo-psychedelia
- Length: 4:01
- Label: Modular
- Songwriter: Andrew Stockdale
- Producer: Alan Moulder

Wolfmother singles chronology
"White Feather" (2010)	"Far Away" (2010)	"Victorious" (2015)

"Far Away" is a song by Australian hard rock band Wolfmother, featured on their 2009 second studio album Cosmic Egg. Written by vocalist and guitarist Andrew Stockdale, the song was released as the fourth single from the album on 3 June 2010, backed with a live cover version of the Kate Bush song "Wuthering Heights".

== Style and reception ==
"Far Away" has been generally well received by critics. Writing for Spin, David Marchese reviewed the song thus:

Get your lighters out! If "In the Morning" was power-ballad-as-psychedelic-rainbow, then "Far Away" is its prom-friendly cousin. Over an almost delicate music box melody played on, I think, electric piano, [Andrew] Stockdale, in a relatively subdued voice, sings about the one that got away: "I believe that love is gonna last forever / But it's all within my mind." An acoustic guitar gently pads things out. The drums play a laidback shuffle. The bass shadows the guitar chords. A melodic major key guitar solo swoops in to guide the listener to Valhalla.

English music magazine NME praised the song as "the only 'progress'" on the album, describing it as "sound[ing] like it was expelled by Axl Rose during an enema in early sessions for ‘Chinese Democracy’." In revealing that the song would be released as the fourth single from Cosmic Egg, Australian news website Access All Areas described "Far Away" as "the hands aloft summit of Wolfmother's colossal second album," adding that it is "Wolfmother's sitting on the porch torch song, an epic slice of melancholic keys and searing guitar that sounds like a big ole bag of all-time good times."

== Music video ==
On 23 February 2010, bassist and keyboardist Ian Peres uploaded a number of photos from the recording of a music video for "Far Away" onto his Facebook profile, in an album titled "Farrah Weigh". On 5 March more photos were uploaded onto the official Wolfmother website, while a news post revealed that the video was directed by Sam Stephens of direction team Hydra, known for the videos for Passion Pit's "The Reeling" and Muse's "Uprising". The video, which record label Modular Recordings described as "old timey and 'reflective'", debuted on Wolfmother's Vevo channel on YouTube on 9 April 2010, and was credited as being directed by Hydra.

== Personnel ==
Wolfmother

- Andrew Stockdale – vocals, lead guitar
- Ian Peres – bass, Rhodes piano
- Aidan Nemeth – rhythm guitar
- Dave Atkins – drums

Production personnel

- Alan Moulder – production, mixing
- Joe Barresi – engineering
