= Rare Tracks (Jet album) =

Compilation album by Jet
- Released: 9 March 2004
- Recorded: 29 May – 8 July 2003
- Genre: Hard rock; garage rock
- Length: 31:45
- Label: Elektra
- Producer: Dave Sardy

Jet chronology
Get Born (2003)	Rare Tracks (2004)	Shine On (2006)

Rare Tracks is a compilation album by the four-piece Australian rock group Jet. At first released exclusively in Japan, the work is a compilation album that features various songs by the band otherwise not included on major studio albums. It additionally includes music videos made by the group. Since it came out in 2004, the album has received various imports into different nations such as the U.S. as well as online-related distribution, such as through Amazon.com to American listeners.

Professional ratings
Review scores
Source	Rating
Allmusic	(not rated) link

== Track listing ==
1. "Are You Gonna Be My Girl" (Live)
2. "Cold Hard Bitch" (Live)
3. "Sgt. Major"
4. "You Don't Look the Same" (Demo)
5. "Bruises" (Demo)
6. "You Were Right" (Demo)
7. "Back Door Santa"
8. "That's Alright Mama" (Live)
9. "Are You Gonna Be My Girl" (Music video version)
10. "Rollover DJ" (Music video version)
11. "Take It or Leave It" (Music video version)

== See also ==
- 2004 in music
- Jet discography

== Notes ==
The rock n roll song "That's Alright Mama" was originally recorded by American artist Elvis Presley, partly inspired by Arthur "Big Boy" Crudup's 1946 blues track "That's All Right". Presley released the single, his first commercially recorded tune, in 1954. It later appeared in its first album form on Presley's The Sun Sessions, which also came out that same year.

"Back Door Santa", written by Clarence Carter and Marcus Daniel, was originally performed by Carter. A sexually suggestive r&b song in the 12-bar blues format, it first received wide release after its inclusion on the multi-artist compilation album Soul Christmas, which was released in November 1968.
