= White Feather (Wolfmother song) =

Song by Australian rock band Wolfmother

Single by Wolfmother

from the album Cosmic Egg
- Released: 22 February 2010
- Genre: Hard rock, blues rock, alternative rock
- Length: 3:04
- Label: Modular
- Songwriter: Andrew Stockdale
- Producer: Alan Moulder

Wolfmother singles chronology
"New Moon Rising" (2009)	"White Feather" (2010)	"Far Away" (2010)

"White Feather" is a song by Australian hard rock band Wolfmother, featured on their 2009 second studio album Cosmic Egg. Written by vocalist and guitarist Andrew Stockdale, the song was released as the third single from the album on 22 February 2010.

== Background ==
"White Feather is a song by Wolfmother. It was first performed on 6 February 2009 at the first of the band's two low-key comeback shows performed under the same alias, White Feather. The song was again performed at the second show, on 8 February, and later at the new lineup's first performance in the United States, on 1 May at the Natural History Museum of Los Angeles County. On 9 May, Stockdale reported on his Twitter profile that he was "About to shred the solo on White Feather," describing it as "possibly the greatest song written since Womac[k] and Womac[k]'s "Foot Steps" Yes!"

The "White Feather" single was first released on the Australian iTunes Store on 29 December 2009. According to independent music website Altsounds.com, a full single release was scheduled for 1 February 2010, although promotional records released in December 2009 listed a 15 February 2010 release date. The official release date is recognised as 22 February 2010.

== Track listing ==
iTunes digital download EP

1. "White Feather" – 3:05
2. "White Feather" (Burns remix) – 5:01
3. "White Feather" (Sébastien Tellier remix) – 3:32
4. "White Feather" (Tiedye remix) – 5:16
5. "White Feather" (Bang Gang "Black Leather" remix) – 7:17

United Kingdom 12-inch single (MODVL125)

1. "White Feather" – 3:05
2. "White Feather" (Sébastien Tellier remix) – 3:32
3. "White Feather" (Burns remix) – 5:01
4. "White Feather" (Bang Gang "Black Leather" remix) – 7:17

Island Records acetate promo

1. "White Feather" (Bang Gang "Black Leather" remix) – 7:18
2. "White Feather" (Burns remix) – 5:01
3. "White Feather" (Sébastien Tellier remix) – 3:32
4. "White Feather" (Tiedye remix) – 5:16
5. "White Feather" (Turzi remix) – 2:43
6. "White Feather" (original mix) – 3:04

== Music video ==
A music video for "White Feather" was filmed in December 2009. Directed by Snakes & Ladders (Pete Moore & Patrick de Teliga), the video premiered on Yahoo! Music on 10 February.

== Personnel ==
Wolfmother

- Andrew Stockdale – vocals, lead guitar
- Ian Peres – bass
- Aidan Nemeth – rhythm guitar
- Dave Atkins – drums

Primary production personnel

- Alan Moulder – production, mixing
- Joe Barresi – engineering

Additional personnel

- Invisible Creature – art direction
- Ryan Clark – graphic design
