= Rip It Up (Jet song) =

2006 single by Jet

"Rip it Up"

Single by Jet

from the album Shine On and TMNT: Teenage Mutant Ninja Turtles (soundtrack)
- B-side: "I Only Like You When I'm High" (demo); "Jane Jones" (demo)
- Released: 27 November 2006
- Length: 3:19
- Label: Capitol
- Songwriters: Chris Cester, Nic Cester, Cameron Muncey
- Producer: Dave Sardy

Jet singles chronology
"Bring It On Back" (2006)	"Rip it Up" (2006)	"Shine On" (2007)

"Rip It Up" is a song from Australian rock band Jet's second album, Shine On (2006). It was released on 27 November 2006 as the album's second single in Australia. Fellow band members and brothers Chris and Nic Cester, together with Cameron Muncey, co-wrote the track.

At a concert at London's Brixton Academy Nic, the lead singer, announced "Here's a song we've written about Paris Hilton – it's called 'Rip It Up'", he referred to American socialite Paris Hilton. Contactmusic.com's reporter claims that the track "includes lyrics threatening to kill Hilton's pet dog... [and] includes a reference to her infamous sex video." The lyrics include a line from the 1939 film, The Wizard of Oz: "I'm gonna get you my pretty, and your little dog too."

"Rip It Up" debuted at No. 67 on the Australian ARIA Singles Chart and peaked at No. 49 for one week before leaving the top 50. "Rip It Up" was released in the United Kingdom as the fourth single from Shine On and as a limited edition 7-inch vinyl but failed to chart. A music video was made for the song.

The song was the official theme song for the WWE pay-per-view event (now premium live event) SummerSlam 2010, the second of a sequence of six consecutive SummerSlam events that were held at the Staples Center in Los Angeles, California.

== Track listing ==
Australian CD single
No.	Title	Writer(s)	Length
1.	"Rip It Up" (album version)	Chris Cester; Nic Cester; Cameron Muncey	3:19
2.	"I Only Like You When I'm High" (Barbados demo)	C Cester, N Cester	3:19
3.	"Jane Jones" (Barbados demo)	Muncey	2:53

== Release history ==
Region	Date	Format(s)	Label(s)	Ref.
Australia	27 November 2006	CD	Capitol	
United Kingdom	1 January 2007	7-inch vinyl	Atlantic	
