= Put Your Money Where Your Mouth Is (song) =

2006 single by Jet

Single by Jet

from the album Shine On
- B-side: "The Night Is Yours"; "Hold On"; "Snap Your Fingers" (demo)
- Released: 11 September 2006
- Length: 2:34
- Label: Capitol
- Songwriters: Chris Cester; Nic Cester; Cameron Muncey
- Producer: Dave Sardy

Jet singles chronology
"Get Me Outta Here" (2005)	"Put Your Money Where Your Mouth Is" (2006)	"Bring It On Back" (2006)

"Put Your Money Where Your Mouth Is" is a song by Australian rock band Jet, included as the third track on their second studio album, Shine On (2006). The song was released on 11 September 2006 as the lead single from that album, peaking at number 14 on the Australian Singles Chart and number 23 on the UK Singles Chart. In the United States, the track was serviced to American modern rock radio on 14 August 2006.

== Music video ==
The official music video for the song depicts the band performing in a room with an older look to the film, including crackles in the picture that intensify with the chorus.

== Track listings ==
- Australian CD single
1. "Put Your Money Where Your Mouth Is"
2. "Hold On"
3. "This Night Is Yours"
- UK CD single
1. "Put Your Money Where Your Mouth Is"
2. "Hold On"
- UK 7-inch pink vinyl single
1. "Put Your Money Where Your Mouth Is"
2. "Snap Your Fingers" (Barbados demo)
- UK 7-inch picture disc single
1. "Put Your Money Where Your Mouth Is"
2. "This Night Is Yours"

== Charts ==
Chart (2006)	Peak position
Australia (ARIA)	14
Canada Rock (Billboard)	6
Italy (FIMI)	46
Scotland Singles (OCC)	14
UK Singles (OCC)	23
US Bubbling Under Hot 100 (Billboard)	9
US Alternative Airplay (Billboard)	7
US Mainstream Rock (Billboard)	14

== Release history ==
Region	Date	Format(s)	Label(s)	Ref(s).
United States	14 August 2006	Modern rock radio	Atlantic	
United Kingdom	4 September 2006	Digital download	Atlantic	
Australia	11 September 2006	CD	Capitol	
United Kingdom	18 September 2006	7-inch vinyl; CD	Atlantic	
