= Bradley Quinn =

British photographer (born 1976)

- Born: 1976 (age 49–50); Bangor, Northern Ireland
- Known for: Photography
- Movement: Belfast Institute
- Relatives: Jonny Quinn (brother); Patricia Quinn (aunt)
- Patrons: Snow Patrol, Cashier No. 9
- Website: www.bradleyquinn.com

Bradley Quinn (born 1976) is a commercial photographer based in Holywood, Northern Ireland. He is the principal photographer of Northern Irish band Snow Patrol He is younger brother to Jonny Quinn, the drummer for Snow Patrol. He started his own business, Bradley Quinn Photography in 2005. He does commercial, advertising and music photography, and uses the Sony alpha camera systems

== Early life ==
Bradley Quinn was born in 1976 in Bangor, younger brother to Jonny Quinn. His aunt is actress Patricia Quinn and cousin Debbie Armstrong, wife of former Northern Ireland assistant manager Gerry Armstrong. He was introduced to photography at an early age by his father, and started doing amateur work using the darkroom in their house. When attending Belfast's Campbell College, he took up photography as a subject for his Arts GCSE. He then attended Belfast Institute to study A level photography. During his years at the Institute, he was picked by in-house photographer Geoff Hannon. It was his first job, which he did for six months. He had plans to attend university, but decided to take an opportunity to work under a commercial and advertising photographer. He worked for ten years and finds the experience "invaluable"; apart from film developing and location lighting, he learnt to deal with finance and marketing.

== Music photography ==
Quinn started to photograph bands his brother Jonny was in, confident one of those would make it. He photographed bands like The New Brontes, Skintflint and Watercress, among other more major bands who were touring at the time. He used to work for free, and sent his shots to the local press. Working with music journalist Colin Harper, the duo's work got exposure in local newspapers and magazines. He has said its difficult to survive on music photography alone, as there are not enough music related publications in Northern Ireland.

During his student years at Campbell College, Quinn had a classmate in Gary Lightbody. Lightbody was later in a band Shrug when he was studying in Dundee and Bradley had told Jonny about him. When Shrug needed a drummer, Jonny moved to Dundee to join the band, which marked the beginning of Snow Patrol. Bradley began shooting them and felt a "good feeling" about the band, and decided to "chart their history". He photographed Jonny in five bands before Snow Patrol and also worked with Northern Irish band File Under Easy Listening; one of that band's members was Nathan Connolly, who later became a member of Snow Patrol. Since the band is friends with Quinn, they are comfortable having him around. He gets access to the stage when the band play, shoot the band relaxing backstage or working in the studio during album recordings. He is trusted enough to edit and select photographs that are to be sent out or uploaded, without consulting the band. His shots of Snow Patrol appear on the band's official website. His favorite songs are "Run" and "If There's a Rocket Tie Me to It", as the on-stage dynamics provide him the best opportunities to take artistic shots. Apart from his work with Snow Patrol, Quinn is the principal photographer for Belfast band Cashier No. 9.

== Other work ==
He is based in Holywood, and started his own business, Bradley Quinn Photography, in 2005 where does commercial photography. His work with Snow Patrol led to his first exhibition, called "Crack the Shutters" in July 2009. It was held at the Waterfront Hall during the Trans festival in Belfast and continued till the end of the month. It showcased 45 images spanning the band's life and two 6-foot-wide (1.8 m) canvasses, one of which was made of 3,000 of his photographs of Snow Patrol. Cashier No. 9 played at the launch of the exhibition. The exhibition was held for three days again (from 7–9 December 2009) at the same venue as Snow Patrol toured in Belfast. He intends to do the exhibition in more venues around the United Kingdom.
