= The Planets Bend Between Us =

Single by Snow Patrol

from the album A Hundred Million Suns
- B-side: "Reading Heaney to Me"
- Released: 24 May 2009
- Studio: Grouse Lodge (County Westmeath, Ireland); Hansa Tonstudio (Berlin, Germany)
- Genre: Alternative rock, soft rock
- Length: 4:18 (album version); 4:01 (single version)
- Label: Fiction/Interscope
- Songwriters: Gary Lightbody, Nathan Connolly, Paul Wilson, Jonny Quinn and Tom Simpson
- Producer: Jacknife Lee

Snow Patrol singles chronology
"If There's a Rocket Tie Me to It" (2009)	"The Planets Bend Between Us" (2009)	"Just Say Yes" (2009)

"The Planets Bend Between Us" (or "The Planets Bend Between Us (For You)") is a song by Northern Irish alternative rock band Snow Patrol, released on 24 May 2009 as the fourth and final single of their fifth album, A Hundred Million Suns (2008). The lyrics were written by Gary Lightbody and the music was composed by Snow Patrol. The song is about Lightbody's beach house in Belfast. The single featured a re-working of the album version and was released as a digital download only. It was later included on the band's first compilation album, Up to Now (2009).

The song was received quite positively by music critics upon the album release, with one critic comparing it to "Chasing Cars". However, commercial reaction to the single was generally negative. The single was a commercial failure, failing to chart in every country barring the Tipparade Chart in the Netherlands.

== Background ==
"The line in the song 'a hundred million suns' just cried out to be the album title. It captures the vastness of the universe and us as tiny dots within it. And it expresses the big sound of the record and it puts it all into perspective."

—Gary Lightbody

At the time of the release of the album, SP.com posted a section featuring lead singer and lyricist Gary Lightbody discussing the new songs, which was initially a Lightbody interview to RTÉ. About 'Planets', he said that the song was about his beach house in Belfast, Northern Ireland. In his words, "there's something about being on a beach in winter time, no-one else is there, it's blowing a gale, raining sideways, and there's something redemptive about yelling into the wind." The song is also notable for having lyrics that named the album.

In a later interview, Lightbody revealed that the song was recorded to be a future single and that the band had "restrained" it for the album. During the band's short tour of Australia in March–April 2009, where they played the second stage of the V Festival, Lightbody, in an interview to Herald Sun stated that the band had re-recorded the song for its single release changing everything, apart from the lyrics and tune. He also said that it was "a big song now".

== Promotion and release ==
The song received its first play on radio on Jo Whiley's Radio 1 show on 27 April at 12:10pm. The song made it the BBC Radio 2's C list, and subsequently got played five times a week, and BBC Radio 1's A list, and subsequently got played twenty times a week. It also made it to BBC 6 Music's B list, and subsequently got played ten times a week. Additionally, the song was added to Xfm's main playlist. The song also made an uncredited appearance on the Grey's Anatomy episode "An Honest Mistake", which aired on 19 February 2009. The show has previously featured Snow Patrol songs like "Open Your Eyes", "Chasing Cars" and "Make this Go on Forever".

'Planets' was the fourth single taken from the album. To promote it, the band played a short set at the Maida Vale Studios on 11 May. The performance was aired live on Ken Bruce's radio show on BBC Radio 2 and was recorded on video, which were posted on the BBC website shortly afterwards. On 13 May, Gary Lightbody and lead guitarist Nathan Connolly joined George Lamb on his radio show on BBC 6 Music and played a short acoustic set which additionally featured "Take Back the City", the first single from A Hundred Million Suns.

The single featured a re-worked version of the song that appeared on the album and was not released in any physical format. There were two versions of digital download, the first having the re-worked version of "The Planets Bend Between Us", which was available from stores like Amazon and HMV. The other version was a bundle exclusively for iTunes, which additionally contained the previously unreleased b-side 'Reading Heaney to Me'. The digital download was released on 24 May and the UK and Ireland iTunes bundles were released on the same day.

== Music video ==
Gary Lightbody in a scene from the music video.

The music video for the song was shot in Cape Town in April 2009, where the band was playing at the Coke Zero Festival. It was directed by Daniel Brereton, who had previously directed the video for the band's previous single "If There's a Rocket Tie Me to It". The video uses the re-worked version of the song and it premiered on SP.com and Snow Patrol's MySpace on 2 May. The video was also placed on the "active rotation" list of MTV Netherlands from the week starting 18 May and named one of the "Must C" videos.

The video features vocalist Gary Lightbody making his way around the city singing the song. Simultaneously, a pair of hands are constantly drawing with a pen, making cut-outs of Lightbody and changing the background behind him, appearing to move him in different places. Lightbody joked about the video: "It's the first video where I haven't been waist deep in water or semi drowned or in the British countryside".

The video was shot in Cape Town, South Africa.

== Reception ==
Although critical reception of the song upon the release of the album was generally positive, it was not considered a strong single. At the time of album release, Spin's Josh Modell received the song well, saying that it defeated "cheesiness with unabashed sincerity". Rolling Stone called it dreamy, whereas Contactmusic called it bland and forgettable. PopMatters' Ross Langager praised the song's chorus, calling it "beautiful, with its pitch-perfect image of separation by an ocean". He also wrote that the song was the ""Chasing Cars" moment of the album, if there was one".

The single's release saw it being generally panned. CityLife's Sarah Walters reviewed the single negatively and gave it 2 stars out of 5. She wrote that the re-working did not add much and did the song more bad than good. She also said that Snow Patrol did not need to change their "winning formula". The Daily Record's Rick Fulton too gave the single 2 stars out of 5. He felt that the band had leaned towards writing ballads after the success of "Chasing Cars." In his words: "Ever since the success of 'Chasing Cars', the band have jettisoned their punky dance leanings for lily-livered ballads that wring their puny hands with grave yearning. Find your fire before you melt into nothing." Clash's Mike Diver reviewed the single negatively as well, calling it "a bit too safe, really – I would have liked to hear some more development in their sound." He felt the song was a nice album track, but didn't have the potential to be a single. He finished his review stating he'd "like to hear something bolder, with more depth", and he felt "that’s what they need now to boost their credibility." The Sunday Mail's Avril Cadden, however reviewed the single positively, awarding it 3 stars out of 5. He called the song "a slow burner, a gentle track with Gary Lightbody's vocals almost whisper like." He wrote though the track didn't stand out, "it glides along effortlessly and lovestruck couples might like it."

The single peaked at #8 on the Dutch Tipparade, a chart which features the Top 30 singles of the week which have a chance to appear in the Dutch Top 40. It dropped out in week 29 after spending seven weeks on the chart. The single also made it to #42 on the UK Airplay Chart.

== Track listing ==
- Digital download
1. "The Planets Bend Between Us" (single version) – 4:01
- iTunes bundle
1. "The Planets Bend Between Us" (single version) – 4:01
2. "Reading Heaney to Me" – 3:08

== Personnel ==
Snow Patrol

- Gary Lightbody – songwriter, vocals, guitar, backing vocals
- Nathan Connolly – guitar, backing vocals
- Paul Wilson – bass guitar, backing vocals
- Jonny Quinn – drums
- Tom Simpson – keyboards

Other personnel

- Jacknife Lee – producer
- Cenzo Townshend – mixing
- Neil Comber – mixing (assistant)
- John Davis – mastering

== Charts ==
Chart performance for "The Planets Bend Between Us"
Chart (2009)	Peak position
Dutch Tipparade	8
UK Airplay Chart	42

== Release history ==
Release history for "The Planets Bend Between Us"
Country/Region	Date	Format
Various	24 May 2009	Digital download
United Kingdom	24 May 2009	iTunes
Ireland	24 May 2009	iTunes
