= Crack the Shutters =

2008 single by Snow Patrol

- 7" vinyl

Single by Snow Patrol

from the album A Hundred Million Suns
- B-side: "Cubicles"
- Released: 12 December 2008
- Recorded: Grouse Lodge (County Westmeath, Ireland); Hansa Tonstudio (Berlin, Germany)
- Genre: Pop rock
- Length: 3:20
- Label: Fiction, Interscope
- Songwriters: Gary Lightbody, Nathan Connolly, Paul Wilson, Jonny Quinn, Tom Simpson
- Producer: Jacknife Lee

Snow Patrol singles chronology
"Take Back the City" (2008)	"Crack the Shutters" (2008)	"If There's a Rocket Tie Me to It" (2009)

"Crack the Shutters" is a song by Northern Irish alternative rock band Snow Patrol, released in different regions on different dates in December 2008 as the second single of their fifth album, A Hundred Million Suns (2008). The lyrics were written by Gary Lightbody and the music was composed by Snow Patrol. The song was described by lyricist Lightbody as the purest love song he'd ever written. The single was received generally positively by music critics, the lyrics and vocals being praised in particular.

The single was quite successful in the charts, charting in the Top 20 in the Netherlands. Though it also entered the Top 30 in Sweden and Germany, it topped the Billboard Triple A chart. "Crack the Shutters" is also the name of a photography exhibition held by Bradley Quinn which primarily featured his photos taken at Snow Patrol concerts.

== Background ==
"This is the purest love song I've ever written. Even more so than "Chasing Cars". It's luxuriating in the beauty and wonder of someone you love with all your heart."

— Gary Lightbody

The song came into being when Gary Lightbody was "tinkering" with the piano with some ideas the band had, and played the first bars of the song. The band laid the song in the studio the same day, which came out quite "fully formed". The initial version of the song has the same structure as the version that appears on the album. The lyric 'crack the shutters open wide' was the first that came to Lightbody, who further commented that it's "the most natural song on the album, it's about the most natural thing in the world".

At the time of the release of the album, SP.com posted a section featuring lead singer and lyricist Gary Lightbody discussing the new songs, which was initially a Lightbody interview to RTÉ. About "Crack the Shutters", he said it was the purest love song he'd ever written. The album A Hundred Million Suns is noted for its positive lyrics, as Lightbody was best known before for break-up songs. The song is the one of many positive songs that Lightbody wrote for the album. In an interview with The Sunday Times, he said, "The problem I've always had with writing about love is that you don't really stop and think about it when it's occurring. This time, I made myself think about it – how to fit it into words. The new lyrics took a lot longer than usual, but I'm proud of them." Lightbody credited producer Jacknife Lee with helping him with lyric writing. He praised him further, adding that it was Lee who taught him the importance of the lyrics sounding as good as they're well written.

== Promotion and release ==
The song became a fan favorite on the Taking Back the Cities Tour. SP.com organized a competition for fans to design the artwork for the single. The only rule was to have "Snow Patrol" and "Crack the Shutters" on the artwork. The winning entry was used on the official website only remix version of the single and the band themselves chose the winner. The song was placed on BBC Radio 2's "A List" playlist for the week commencing 6 December 2008, and subsequently got played twenty times a week. The song has also been featured on the 90210 episode "Help Me, Rhonda", which aired on 3 February 2009. Additionally, the band donated the song to be used in the soundtrack for a promotional video for the "Not in My Name" campaign.

The single was released in two physical formats: a CD single and a 7-inch vinyl. The CD single, which saw a full release featured a new song, the previously unreleased b-side "Cubicles". The 7-inch vinyl, which had a limited release featured a cover of Elbow's "One Day Like This", recorded on Jo Whiley's "Live Lounge on Tour". The pressing was limited to 500 copies, and was only available at HMV Music Stores. An iTunes Store bundle included the single and the "Haunts Remix" of the song. Another iTunes single was the "Kid Glove Remix" of the track. Both singles were made available digitally on 14 December 2008. The physical single was released on 12 December in Ireland, 15 December in the UK, and 16 December in Australia and Germany, and 19 December in the Netherlands.

== Reception ==
Critical reception towards the single was generally positive. Yahoo! Music's Jairne Gill reviewed the single positively, giving it seven stars out of ten. In spite of this, he criticized Snow Patrol for "established the kind of ruthless commercial formula more commonly associated with corporations like Microsoft or Starbucks." He also said that "the first single back is always a semi-rocky, fidgety beast - as if to reassure people they are still an indie band at heart, you know - and is swiftly followed by a big, sweltering, lovelorn ballad designed to make housewives melt and bring US television executives in search of a season finale running to them with blank cheques." He went on to say that the song was rather lovely. He praised the guitar and glockenspiel in the song, and called the chorus "a warm hug". He also felt that vocalist Gary Lightbody's feelings sound genuine in the song. The Sunday Mail's Avril Cadden, though called the song "nothing new and typical Snow Patrol", but defended it, saying that it has "a cracking tune and the best from that album." To her, Snow Patrol were "back on form". She further praised the song, calling it "rousing and effective". She also called the lyrics "heartfelt" and the vocals "emotive", which "give you a warm glow". She awarded the single four stars out of five. The Daily Record's John Dingwall also gave the single four stars out of five. He called the album "brilliant" and the song "cleverly-written". He felt the delivery of the vocals was "perfect" and Gary Lightbody's "emotive vocals" provided "the icing on the cake."

Nick Levine of Digital Spy, however reviewed the single negatively, giving it two stars out of five. He wrote that the single sounded similar to their earlier work, and that it "chugs along from intimate, piano-driven verses to choruses that are supposed to coax the mobile phones out of punters' pockets at their arena gigs." He criticized the chorus for not being "as rousing as it thinks it is". He ended saying fans should rather buy Take That's album The Circus instead.

The song was named the "Record of the Week" in the Netherlands for week two of 2009. The single peaked at number 43 on the UK Singles Chart, making it the band's first single to miss the UK Top 40 since the original release of "Spitting Games", back in 2003. The single lasted eight weeks in the UK Top 75 and ten weeks in the UK Top 100. However, the song was a success in the Netherlands, reaching number 14, as did Snow Patrol's other most successful Dutch single: "Shut Your Eyes" but charting five weeks less than the latter. Furthermore, the single topped the Triple A chart in the United States, a feat previously achieved by "Take Back the City", the previous single released from A Hundred Million Suns. Till date, the single has spent a total of seventy weeks on record charts around the world.

== Music video ==
The audience with flashlights creates an effect of the performance in an arena.

The music video for the song was shot after the band finished the Take Back the Cities whistle-stop tour. It was produced by Suza Horvat and directed by Kevin Godley. The video opens with the band playing the opening bars of the song on their respective instruments.

Gary Lightbody is then shown singing the lyrics with the camera focused on his lips. The camera zooms out, slowly revealing his full face. As the song reaches its chorus, the camera zooms out quickly to show the whole band and a crowd of people are shown running past. The people disappear as the chorus ends. Till the next chorus, there are interspersed shots of all five band members.

The second chorus again shows a crowd of people running past the band. As the second chorus nears its end, a crowd of people are shown approaching the band with flashlights in their hands. The shots then shown of the band performing appear as if it is a live performance in an arena. The band goes on to finish the song, and the video ends with a shot of Lightbody resting on his microphone.

== Track listings ==
- UK and Australian CD single
1. "Crack the Shutters" – 3:20
2. "Cubicles" – 3:11
- European CD
1. "Crack the Shutters" – 3:20
2. "Cubicles" – 3:11
3. "Crack the Shutters" (Haunts Remix) – 5:01
4. "Crack the Shutters" (Kid Glove Remix) – 4:16
5. "Take Back the City" (Video)
- SP.com exclusive
1. "Crack the Shutters" (Kid Glove Remix) - 4:16
- 7-inch vinyl

A. "Crack the Shutters" – 3:20
B. "One Day Like This" (Elbow Cover Version - Radio 1 Live Lounge Session) – 5:03
- "One Day Like This" is a cover of the song by Elbow. Recorded on Jo Whiley's "Live Lounge on Tour".

- iTunes bundle
1. "Crack the Shutters" – 3:20
2. "Crack the Shutters" (Haunts Remix) – 5:01
- iTunes digital download
1. "Crack the Shutters" (Kid Glove Remix) – 4:16

== Personnel ==
Snow Patrol

- Gary Lightbody – vocals, guitar, backing vocals
- Nathan Connolly – guitar, backing vocals
- Paul Wilson – bass guitar, backing vocals
- Jonny Quinn – drums
- Tom Simpson – keyboards

Other personnel

- Jacknife Lee – producer
- Cenzo Townshend – mixing
- Neil Comber – mixing (assistant)
- John Davis – mastering

== Charts ==
=== Weekly charts ===
Chart (2008–2009)	Peak position
Australia (ARIA)	57
Austria (Ö3 Austria Top 40)	32
Belgium (Ultratop 50 Flanders)	42
Belgium (Ultratip Bubbling Under Wallonia)	19
Canada Digital Songs (Billboard)	58
European Hot 100 Singles (Billboard)	65
Germany (GfK)	28
Ireland (IRMA)	32
Japan (Japan Hot 100)	67
Netherlands (Dutch Top 40)	14
Netherlands (Single Top 100)	36
Scottish Singles Sales (Official Charts)	31
Sweden (Sverigetopplistan)	29
Switzerland (Schweizer Hitparade)	72
UK Singles (Official Charts)	43
US Bubbling Under Hot 100 (Billboard)	11
US Adult Alternative Airplay (Billboard)	1
US Adult Pop Airplay (Billboard)	37

=== Year-end charts ===
Chart (2009)	Position
US Adult Alternative Songs (Billboard)	2

=== All-time charts ===
Chart (1995–2021)	Position
US Adult Alternative Songs (Billboard)	60

== Certifications ==
Region	Certification	Certified units/sales
Australia (ARIA)	Gold	35,000^{‡}
United Kingdom (BPI)	Silver	200,000^{‡}
^{‡} Sales+streaming figures based on certification alone.

== Release history ==
Release history and formats for "Crack the Shutters"
Region	Date	Format	Ref(s).
Ireland	12 December 2008	Compact disc	
Various	14 December 2008	iTunes	
United Kingdom	15 December 2008	Compact disc, 7-inch vinyl	
Australia	16 December 2008	Compact disc	
Germany	16 December 2008	Compact disc	
Netherlands	19 December 2008	Compact disc	

== Exhibition ==
A scene from the video for "The Lightning Strike".

"Crack the Shutters" is also the name of an exhibition held at the annual Trans Festival, organized by the Urban Arts Academy. Held at Gallery 2 of the Waterfront Hall in Belfast on 8 July 2009 until the end of the month, the exhibition featured photographer Bradley Quinn's series of Snow Patrol concert photos, both onstage and offstage. Bradley is the brother of Snow Patrol drummer Jonny Quinn and was classmates with Gary Lightbody in school. He has known the band members from before the band existed and was the one who took their first press shots.

Along with tour diaries and music videos, the exhibition showcased the sixteen-minute animation for "The Lightning Strike", which the band has been playing at recent concerts like the Taking Back the Cities Tour. Indie rock group Cashier No. 9, who supported Snow Patrol during their UK & Ireland Arena Tour of February–March 2009 also played a concert, which was open to all ages. To mark the event, SP.com organized a competition to give away five signed and unframed limited edition prints of Bradley's work. Fans were required to email in their details to participate.
