= Signal Fire (song) =

- CD single

Single by Snow Patrol

from the album Music from and Inspired by Spider-Man 3
- Released: 24 April 2007
- Recorded: Early 2007 at Grouse Lodge, County Westmeath, Ireland
- Genre: Alternative rock; power pop
- Length: 4:29 (album version); 3:57 (single edit)
- Label: Fiction, Record Collection
- Songwriters: Nathan Connolly; Gary Lightbody; Jonny Quinn; Tom Simpson; Paul Wilson
- Producer: Jacknife Lee

Snow Patrol singles chronology
| "Shut Your Eyes" (2007) | "Signal Fire" (2007) | "Take Back the City" (2008) |

Alternative cover
- Web-shaped vinyl

"Signal Fire" is a song by Northern Irish alternative rock band Snow Patrol, appearing on the soundtrack of the film Spider-Man 3 after it was initially offered to Shrek the Third. Released on 24 April, 30 April, 2 May and 14 May 2007, depending on the region, and recorded at Grouse Lodge with long-time Snow Patrol producer Jacknife Lee, it was the only single released from the soundtrack. The song was later included in the 20th anniversary special edition of the band's fourth album Eyes Open.

The single was released as a special web-shaped vinyl in the UK, where it became the band's most successful single, peaking at number 4. However, critical reception towards the single was generally mixed, with one critic calling it "unoriginal". The music video for the song was nominated for the Best Video from a Film category at the MTV Video Music Awards Japan 2008.

== Background ==
The band visited Grouse Lodge with producer Jacknife Lee in early 2007 to record the song. Drummer Jonny Quinn, injured at the time because of his snowboarding accident in January, drummed with one hand during the recording sessions.

A demo of the song was initially offered by the band for Shrek the Third, but was rejected. Gary Lightbody revealed the band's involvement with Spider-Man 3 on 5 March 2007. Quinn later said: "Shrek didn't like it, but Spider-Man did." Though he wasn't sure where the song would be appearing in the film, he was excited at being associated with the franchise and was quoted as saying: "'Signal Fire' will be featured in the trailers and the movie itself. It may only appear over the end credits, but hey, it's Spidey!" The song was finally used in the credits.

== Promotion and release ==
Snow Patrol's website organized a competition to give away two tickets for T in the Park, which was open to UK and Ireland fans. Fans were required to create a video, which could be about anything, but the song had to be used as the soundtrack. Before the song was officially released, it was put up on the band's official website as a live stream. The website also revealed the single's artwork on 5 April. The single was released in three formats: Vinyl, CD and Digital Download and first appeared on sale on the US iTunes on 24 April, followed by rest of the world on the 30th.

The physical CD single was released in Australia and Japan on 2 May. The Australian CD single was backed with three b-sides, all songs taken from a live performance. The single was released in the UK and Ireland in two formats: Vinyl and CD. Both formats were released on 14 May, which included a remix of the song "Wow". Remixed by Eddy Temple-Morris, the "Eddy TM Loser Remix" was much requested on the band's website. The remix was later included on Temple-Morris' compilation album Dance Rocks. The vinyl release was on a specially created web-shaped vinyl housed in a PVC sleeve. The single could also be pre-ordered from HMV and Amazon.

== Reception ==
Critical reception of the single was generally mixed. MusicOMH's Jenni Cole reviewed the song positively, calling it "a decent song, whether it's tied to a blockbuster movie or not." She noted the crescendo at the song's end saying that it's an "unusual tempo that gives a definite impression of needing some accompanying visuals before it will make complete sense. Then it quietens down again, a bit like the fast, slow, fast, fast, slow that's supposedly the magic formula for plotting movie acts." She found the song gets "catchier the more times you hear it and it works remarkably well." She also felt the band "manage(d) to keep their own identity throughout the song - not always easy on a franchise soundtrack - and that deserves some praise on its own." The Daily Record's Rick Fulton reviewed the single positively as well, writing it has Snow Patrol's "trade-mark epic quiet-slow, then loud-fast blueprint". He awarded it 4 stars out of 5 and named it the single of the week. Billboard's review was positive as well. If felt the song was "a powerful love song written in the first person". It praised Lightbody's vocals, saying that though it would be easy for a singer to overdo the chorus, Lightbody did it as if he was "unimpressed".

However, Stereogum's review of the single was extremely negative. It called the song "drab" and mocked the band for "doing the piano sap rock so effectively", saying only "moms and first dates" will like it. NME made comparisons between Gary Lightbody and "Spider-man" Peter Parker, saying both live double lives, with Lightbody's duality being a "mainstream/indie bastard hybrid". It said that both had to choose between their "good and dark sides". It then reviewed the single negatively, writing that the single "cops out, squatting uncomfortably between the two and leaving us in a web of indifference". Manchester Evening News' Glenn Meads reviewed the single negatively. He called it "samey" and "unoriginal", with "all of the usual Snow Patrol trademarks; slow burning chorus, big production values, and heart felt lyrics - it all builds to a big crescendo". He further criticized the song as "empty" as a "summer blockbuster; like Spidey". The song made its live debut on 5 June 2007 at an exclusive show at King Tut's Wah Wah Hut for Xfm to good reception by the 350-strong crowd.

Hot Press had praise for the Eddy Temple-Morris remix of "Wow". The magazine also ordered ten copies of the vinyl, calling it "nifty".

The single was a moderate success on the charts, charting in six charts around the world, where it spent a collective fifty-seven weeks. However, it was a success in the UK and Ireland, reaching number four and number two, respectively. It additionally reached the top 30 in Australia and France. Furthermore, the single is the band's biggest chart hit to date. The music video for "Signal Fire" was nominated for the "Best Video from a Film" category at the MTV Video Music Awards Japan 2008, which was won by Hikaru Utada for her song "Beautiful World".

== Music video ==
The band flew to Canada to shoot the video for the song, which premiered on the Q website on 13 April. On 16 April 2007 a 60-second promotional clip was shown on the band's official website, with members able to see the full video in the members section. The video was directed by Paul McGuigan, who had previously worked with the band for the video to "Set the Fire to the Third Bar". Lightbody has also expressed his desire to work with McGuigan (among other independent film directors) on a film someday in the future.

Green Goblin tries to kidnap Mary Jane Watson.

The video features school children enacting scenes from the first two Spider-Man films on stage, with the band playing the song. It opens with a scene showing the children's parents making their way into the hall beside a board reading: "Tonight: Spider-Man". The curtain opens and children dressed as Peter Parker and Mary Jane Watson appear on stage, with Parker taking photographs of Watson. A boy dressed as a spider is then shown being pulled up with ropes. He is then lowered down to the stage and proceeds to bite Parker on the neck. The next scenes show Parker's affinity for Watson, with Parker peeking at her through his bedroom window while she combs her hair. He then lies down to sleep as the song reaches its chorus.

During the chorus he is shown to be "writhing" in the bed, which ends with him tearing his shirt open and revealing the Spider-Man costume underneath. He is then shown crawling and climbing buildings in the city in the full costume. As Lightbody sings "In the confusion and the aftermath...", a scene shows robbers who have just come out of a bank. Spider-Man arrives and proceeds to "hit" them; signs such as "POW!" are shown to create the effect. He then "catches" them with his web and the police arrives. Throughout this there are scenes of the boy dressed as the spider looking on. A child then shows a board saying "Spider-Man saves the day!!!", and Watson is shown swooning over the hero.

The next scene shows the Green Goblin trying to kidnap Watson, but Spider-Man disorients him by throwing a web over him and Watson uses the distraction to escape. Doctor Octopus then appears and begins to catch and kill various citizens with his claws. The next scene atop a bus shows Doctor Octopus trying to take Watson away, but she manages to run away after hitting him. Spider-Man then appears, fighting the villain and "killing" him. He is shown being lowered down and Watson comes to him, removing his goggles and revealing his identity. Then, the boy dressed as the spider comes up to her and kisses her on the cheek. The children bow down to thank the applauding audience, and a scene then shows the "spider" and Watson on a web, with the "spider" smiling for the first time. The "black Spider-Man" then makes an appearance, holding a board which reads "Coming soon! Spider-Man 3".

== Track listing ==
- UK/Irish CD single:
1. "Signal Fire" – 3:57
2. "Wow" (Eddy TM Loser Remix) – 5:39
- UK/Irish Web-shaped Vinyl:

A: "Signal Fire" – 3:57
B: "Wow" (Eddy TM Loser Remix) – 5:39

- Digital Download:
1. "Signal Fire" – 3:57
- Australian CD single:
1. "Signal Fire" – 3:57
2. "Chocolate" (Live) – 3:03
3. "Run" (Live) – 5:38
4. "Spitting Games" (Live) – 4:17

Live tracks recorded at Columbiahalle, Berlin on 9 February 2007.

- UK Promo CD:
1. "Signal Fire" (Album Version) – 4:29

== Charts ==
| Chart (2007) | Peak position |
|---|---|
| ARIA Singles Chart | 22 |
| European Hot 100 Singles | 11 |
| French Singles Chart | 23 |
| Irish Singles Chart | 2 |
| Japanese Singles Chart | 75 |
| Swiss Charts | 48 |
| UK Singles (OCC) | 4 |
| UK Airplay (Music Week) | 5 |
| US Billboard Hot 100 | 65 |

=== Year-end charts ===
| Chart (2007) | Position |
|---|---|
| UK Singles Chart | 100 |

== Personnel ==
Snow Patrol

- Gary Lightbody – lead vocals, guitar
- Nathan Connolly – guitar, backing vocals
- Paul Wilson – bass guitar, backing vocals
- Jonny Quinn – drums
- Tom Simpson – keyboards, backing vocals

Other personnel

- Jacknife Lee – producer, programming, engineering
- Cenzo Townshend – mixing
- Neil Comber – mixing (assistant)
- John Davis – mastering
- James Banbury – strings arrangement

== Release history ==
| Country/Region | Date | Format |
|---|---|---|
| United States | 24 April 2007 | iTunes |
| Rest of the world | 30 April 2007 | iTunes |
| Australia | 2 May 2007 | Compact disc |
| Japan | 2 May 2007 | Compact disc |
| United Kingdom | 14 May 2007 | Compact disc, Web-shaped vinyl |
| Ireland | 14 May 2007 | Compact disc, Web-shaped vinyl |
