= Spider-Man 3 (soundtrack) =

Music from and Inspired by Spider-Man 3

Soundtrack album by various artists
- Released: May 4, 2007
- Genre: Indie rock
- Length: 60:12
- Label: Record Collection
- Producer: Dave Sardy

Singles from Music from and Inspired by Spider-Man 3
- 1. "Signal Fire" Released: April 24, 2007

Professional ratings
Review scores
Source	Rating
Allmusic	2/5 stars

Music from and Inspired by Spider-Man 3 is a soundtrack album to Sam Raimi's 2007 film Spider-Man 3. It was released on May 1, 2007.

== Overview ==
Unlike the first two Spider-Man soundtrack releases, the album does not feature any of the film's score by Christopher Young. The entire concept of this soundtrack is that each song was written (or recorded in the case of The Flaming Lips) for the soundtrack exclusively, with the exception of Chubby Checker's 1960 hit "The Twist". The album does not include the James Brown song "People Get Up and Drive Your Funky Soul", which is played in the film during the scene in which Peter, under the influence of the alien symbiote, struts and dances in the street.

== Release ==
The special edition of the album was made available only on the soundtrack's website. It contains a bonus track (the "Theme from Spider-Man" covered by The Flaming Lips), a 32-page embossed hardcover book featuring movie stills and all five collectable movie cards inside 8"x8" box made from a replica of the rubberized black Spider-Man suit.

Additionally, the digital version was made available for pre-order on iTunes and does contain "The Theme from Spider-Man" by The Flaming Lips.

== Reception ==
Following its release, the soundtrack debuted at number 33 on the U.S. Billboard 200, selling about 21,000 copies in its first week.

== Track listing ==
No.	Title	Writer(s)	Artist	Length
1.	"Signal Fire"	Nathan Connolly; Gary Lightbody; Tom Simpson; Jonathan Quinn; Paul Wilson	Snow Patrol	4:26
2.	"Move Away"	Brandon Flowers; Dave Keuning; Mark Stoermer	The Killers	3:52
3.	"Sealings"	Karen Orzolek; Nick Zinner; Brian Chase	Yeah Yeah Yeahs	4:32
4.	"Pleased to Meet You"	Andrew Stockdale	Wolfmother	4:44
5.	"Red River"	The Walkmen	The Walkmen	2:53
6.	"Stay Free"	Black Mountain	Black Mountain	4:28
7.	"The Supreme Being Teaches Spider-Man How to Be in Love"	The Flaming Lips	The Flaming Lips	3:25
8.	"Scared of Myself"	Blake Mills; Taylor Goldsmith	Simon Dawes	4:54
9.	"The Twist"	Hank Ballard	Chubby Checker	2:35
10.	"Sightlines"	Zach Rogue	Rogue Wave	3:39
11.	"Summer Day"	Jason Schwartzman	Coconut Records	2:05
12.	"Falling Star"	Nic Cester; Chris Cester	Jet	3:35
13.	"Portrait of a Summer Thief"	Lang Freeman; Sonny Sanchez; Bradley Oliver; Douglas Wilson	Sounds Under Radio	4:15
14.	"A Letter from St. Jude"	Rory Carlile; Daragh Dukes	The WYO's	4:12
15.	"Small Parts"	Greg Eklund; Mark Eklund; Olivia Stone	The Oohlas	3:39

Additional track on the European and Australian editions
No.	Title	Writer(s)	Artist	Length
5.	"Cut Off the Top (Timo Maas Dirty Rocker Remix)"	Arnim Teutoburg-Weiss; Bernd Kurtzke; Peter Baumann-Duese; Thomas Götz; Torsten Scholz	Beatsteaks	3:03

Bonus track on the digital edition
No.	Title	Writer(s)	Artist	Length
16.	"Theme from Spider Man"	Paul Francis Webster; Bob Harris	The Flaming Lips	2:28

== Chart positions ==
Chart (2007)	Peak position
U.S. Billboard 200	33
Top Soundtracks	2

== See also ==
- Spider-Man 3 § Music
