= If There's a Rocket Tie Me to It =

- 7" vinyl

Single by Snow Patrol

from the album A Hundred Million Suns
- B-side: "In a Dream I Saw Satellites"
- Released: 8 March 2009
- Studio: Grouse Lodge (County Westmeath, Ireland); Hansa Tonstudio (Berlin, Germany)
- Genre: Alternative rock; power pop; pop rock
- Length: 4:19 (album version); 3:37 (radio edit)
- Label: Fiction; Interscope
- Songwriters: Gary Lightbody; Nathan Connolly; Paul Wilson; Jonny Quinn; Tom Simpson
- Producer: Jacknife Lee

Snow Patrol singles chronology
"Crack the Shutters" (2008)	"If There's a Rocket Tie Me to It" (2009)	"The Planets Bend Between Us" (2009)

"If There's a Rocket Tie Me to It" is a song by Northern Irish alternative rock band Snow Patrol, released on 8 March 2009 as the third single of their fifth album, A Hundred Million Suns (2008). The music was composed by Snow Patrol, with frontman Gary Lightbody writing the lyrics. The song is a departure from Lightbody's frequent attempts at diagnosing his less positive personal issues, which often focus on his romantic breakups, and instead celebrates a newfound love outside human relationships.

The song, though critically lauded upon the album release, was generally not received well as a single. The single was a commercial failure, failing to reach the Top 100 in the United Kingdom, and failing to chart in any other country. The single was later released in the Netherlands but failed to chart as well.

== Background ==
At the time of the release of the album, Snow Patrol.com posted a section featuring a discussion of the song with the band's lyricist, Gary Lightbody discussing the new songs, which was initially a Lightbody interview to RTÉ. About "If There's a Rocket Tie Me to It", he said that the song "was a love record rather than a break up record". He continued to say that the song was "set in the context of a world that's as terrifying as it is beautiful, which is why a lot of the imagery refers to space." He maintained the positivity of the song, saying "I don't think we're doomed, but there's darkness here, looming over me rather than in me". The album's lyrics were influenced by Lightbody's newly discovered love of science. In an interview with The Sunday Times, he said "I didn't have any aptitude for it at school, but I've become very interested in science over the past couple of years." He commented on the positive lyrics, adding "in the past, my lyrics have sometimes been bogged down by my own self-flagellation — can't see past my fingertips. This time, the opposite has happened. It's about realizing that we're just dots."

== Promotion and release ==
To promote the single, the band made an appearance on Channel 4's show T4 on 7 February. The performance was aired between 9 am and 2 pm.

The single was initially issued only in the UK as a 7" Vinyl and Digital Download. The iTunes digital download featured the single and the music video. It was released in the UK and Ireland on 8 March. The 7" single featured a new song, the previously unreleased b-side "In a Dream I Saw Satellites", written, composed and performed by frontman Gary Lightbody, without any collaboration with the rest of the band. The song later became the fourth Dutch single from the album, after "Take Back the City", "Crack the Shutters" and "The Planets Bend Between Us". To promote it, the band played an intimate concert at Desmet Studios as a part of Radio BNN's "That's Live" programme, which features artists doing such concerts. The performance was broadcast on 3FM between 6 pm and 9 pm on 1 August. Tickets for the concert only be won through a competition organized by BNN. Though 15 pairs of tickets were initially announced as prizes, 48 winners were announced, who were notified through e-mail.

== Music video ==
Nathan Connolly in a scene from the music video. The origami can be seen in the background.

The music video for the song was produced by Jon Adams and directed by Daniel Brereton. It premiered on AOL Video in January. The video was also added to playlists of TV channels including MTV, Q and The Box. The video was praised by Getmusic for being "as iridescent and tender as the single". However, The Irish Times hated it and said it should be skipped.

The video features the band members wandering beside a beach. They chance upon an abandoned boat which is decorated with origami stars, which were featured on the album artwork for A Hundred Million Suns. After taking the time to examine them, the camera pans to Nathan Connolly, who has noticed a cottage a short distance away. He starts to walk towards it and the band members follow behind. Upon entering the cottage, they light lamps, with the room glowing with the reflection of identical origami stars that they had seen by the boat.

As the camera pans to Lightbody, his look of surprise is revealed; by opening a door, hot air balloons can be seen flying in the air, and the bandmates stop to examine them. The next sequence of shots show Lightbody walking in an area lighted by lamps. The camera then pans away from him to the band performing the song on their instruments. The end shots of the video show Lightbody with outstretched arms and a lone flying hot-air balloon.

== Reception ==
Although critical reception upon the release of the album was very positive, as a single, the song did not fare as well. Upon album release, Rolling Stone said that the band was all about "big, echoing soundscapes", "gargantuan guitar crescendos" and emotions that could only be described in mythology and astronomy. PopMatters called the song "a moodier kickoff than "You’re All I Have", the instant power-pop anthem that served as the introduction to Eyes Open". It praised the lyric where Gary Lightbody sings about having a strand of his lover's hair wrapped around his finger, calling it "borderline saccharine". The Independent called the song an attempt to "broaden the band's style". It felt the song was "intriguing", and noted the "conversational tone and diffident delivery", saying it may have been inspired by Sufjan Stevens. It also named the song among the picks from the album. Pitchfork Media, who rated the album as a whole at only 4.9/10, still praised the song, saying, "If A Hundred Million Suns has any hits in it at all, they're likely over and done in the album's first eight minutes." Continuing, the review commented that "the song was Snow Patrol at their best and most emblematic." Lightbody's vocal delivery style was praised, saying that it "softens the blow of overwrought lyrics", citing 'the sea between us only amplifies the sound waves' as an example.

Upon the release of the song, Daily Music Guide's Wayne Madden reviewed the single negatively, giving it 2 stars out of 5. He criticized it for having the same bars repeated for a whole minute. He felt the song wasn't bad, but was no stunner. He also called the sound "Coldplay-esque" and compared the sound to early Snow Patrol records. BBC Radio 1's Vicki Lutas too gave the single a rating of 2 stars out of 5, saying that Snow Patrol had become lazy. She did like the chorus, though, saying it "makes you sit up and take notice for a little minute". UKMix's Beren Reid awarded the single 2 stars out of 5 as well, calling the single "drab". He ridiculed it, saying it "doesn't sound single worthy" and furthermore didn't "deserve to be the b-side of a b-side". The Northern Echo's Sophie Stratford however, reviewed the single very positively, saying that the band's reputation was about to get bigger. She praised the vocals and the sound, and felt that the lyrics "live long in your head for hours afterwards".

The single failed to chart in any country barring the UK, where it peaked at a lowly #133, but it was fairly successful on the UK Airplay Chart, peaking at #36. In October 2008, the song ranked #30 in Q's The 50 Essential Tracks to Download This Month.

== Track listing ==
- 7" vinyl

A: "If There's a Rocket Tie Me to It" – 4:15
B: "In a Dream I Saw Satellites" (Garageband demo) – 2:53

- Dutch iTunes digital download
1. "If There's a Rocket Tie Me to It" – 4:19
2. "In a Dream I Saw Satellites" (Garageband demo) – 2:57
- UK/Irish iTunes digital download
1. "If There's a Rocket Tie Me to It" – 4:19
2. "If There's a Rocket Tie Me to It" (video) – 3:40

The video for "If There's a Rocket Tie Me to It" uses the radio edit of the song.

- Promo CD
1. "If There's a Rocket Tie Me to It" (radio edit) – 3:37

== Personnel ==
Snow Patrol

- Gary Lightbody – vocals, guitar, backing vocals
- Nathan Connolly – guitar, backing vocals
- Paul Wilson – bass guitar, backing vocals
- Jonny Quinn – drums
- Tom Simpson – keyboards

Other personnel

- Jacknife Lee – producer, additional guitar
- Cenzo Townshend – mixing
- Neil Comber – mixing (assistant)
- John Davis – mastering

== Charts ==
Chart performance for "If There's a Rocket Tie Me to It"
Chart (2009)	Peak position
UK Airplay Chart	36
UK Singles Chart	133

== Release history ==
Release history and formats for "If There's a Rocket Tie Me to It"
Country/Region	Date	Format
United Kingdom	8 March 2009	iTunes
Ireland	8 March 2009	iTunes
United Kingdom	9 March 2009	7" vinyl
Netherlands	2009	iTunes
