= AHMS =

AHMS may refer to:

- A Hundred Million Suns, album by Snow Patrol
- Austrian Holocaust Memorial Service
- American Home Missionary Society
