= Laminate (band) =

Irish hard rock band

- Origin: Wexford, Eíre
- Genre: hard rock
- Years active: 2003 – 2008
- Label: currently no label
- Members: Derren Dempsey; Marc Hillis; Johnny Fox
- Past members: Lee Byrne

Laminate were a hard rock band from Co. Wexford, Ireland. They formed in Wexford in 2003, initially as a side-project for singer/guitarist Derren Dempsey and singer/drummer Marc Hillis, both of whom were active members in other bands at the time. Having played around the local area a few times, Derren, Marc and then bassist Lee Byrne decided to leave their respective bands to concentrate purely on Laminate. They recorded a three track demo in Grouse Lodge (famed for having hosted Muse & The Manic Street Preachers among others) which was well received by Kerrang! Magazine, and received a 9 out of 10 in Rock Sound Magazine.

The band followed this with support shows for Kerbdog, Jetplane Landing, and Hueman on some of their Irish dates. In early 2006, Johnny Fox was recruited for bass and vocal duties, which would complete the definitive line-up and start a new period for the band. Laminate's ever evolving sound has been described in many ways, with some calling it punk rock, others saying it's too melodic to be punk, and some seeing it simply as an eclectic blend of heavy rock music.

Following a quiet last few months in 2007 and remaining inactive gig-wise for most of 2008, Laminate announced they were to split, but not without one final three song EP which was very well received. Laminate also played what was thought to be two final gigs in Kilkenny and Wexford but 18 years later Laminate played 1 more gig at Rock Garman Festival in Screen, Wexford on May 23rd, 2026.

Derren, Johnny and Marc played in rock band Ger Fox Sailing afterwards.
