= Where My Communist Heart Meets My Capitalist Mind =

Studio album by Sounds Under Radio
- Released: May 3, 2011
- Genre: Alternative rock
- Length: 50:30
- Label: The Musebox/EMI
- Producer: Will Hoffman

Sounds Under Radio chronology
'Cinematica' (2008)	Where My Communist Heart Meets My Capitalist Mind (2011)

Professional ratings
Review scores
Source	Rating
Absolutepunk	3/4 stars

Where My Communist Heart Meets My Capitalist Mind is the second studio album by alternative rock band Sounds Under Radio.

Songs "All You Wanted" and "Sing" were featured in season 1 of The Vampire Diaries on episodes "Let the Right One In" and "Isobel", respectively. All You Wanted also appeared on The Vampire Diaries: Original Television Soundtrack.

== Track listing ==
All tracks are written by Sounds Under Radio except as shown.

No.	Title	Length
1.	". _ _ . _ . _ . _ . _ . _ _ _ _ _ _ . . . _ . _ . . _ . _"	1:03
2.	"The Arsonist"	3:44
3.	"Sing"	3:27
4.	"Effigy"	4:29
5.	"Fire Escape"	4:17
6.	"God vs Me"	3:24
7.	"I Am An Ambulance"	3:45
8.	"Army Of Me" (Björk)	4:34
9.	"Surrender"	4:44
10.	"All You Wanted"	5:10
11.	"Better Way"	4:31
12.	"Halo"	7:28

== Personnel ==
Sounds Under Radio

- Lang Freeman - voice, guitar
- Bradley Oliver - bass, voice, synth, piano
- Sonny Sanchez - drums, percussion
- Doug Wilson - guitar, effects

Additional Musicians

- Avi Ghosh - additional keyboards (track 12)

Production

- Will Hoffman - production, engineering, mixing
- Lang Freeman - production/engineering (tracks 6, 9, 11, 12)
- Joey Benjamin - engineering (assistant)
- Will Krienke - engineering (assistant)
- Ryan Lipman - engineering (assistant)
- Bob Boyd - mastering

Design

- Sonny Sanchez - art direction & design
- Jeff Ray - photography & concept
- Shawn Lyon - layout
- Sam Stone - boy (model)
