= A Hundred Million Suns =

Studio album by Snow Patrol
- Released: 24 October 2008
- Recorded: Mid-2008
- Studios: Grouse Lodge, County Westmeath, Ireland; Hansa Tonstudio, Berlin, Germany
- Genres: Alternative rock; power pop; indie rock
- Length: 58:16
- Labels: Fiction; Geffen
- Producer: Jacknife Lee

Snow Patrol chronology
Eyes Open (2006)	A Hundred Million Suns (2008)	Up to Now (2009)

Singles from A Hundred Million Suns
- 1. "Take Back the City" Released: 5 October 2008; 2. "Crack the Shutters" Released: 12 December 2008; 3. "If There's a Rocket Tie Me to It" Released: 8 March 2009; 4. "The Planets Bend Between Us" Released: 24 May 2009; 5. "The Lightning Strike (What If This Storm Ends?)" Released: 25 February 2013

A Hundred Million Suns is the fifth studio album by Northern Irish alternative rock band Snow Patrol, released through Fiction Records and Geffen Records on 24 October 2008 in Ireland, 25 October in Australia, 27 October in the United Kingdom and the rest of Europe, and 28 October in the United States. The album was written by Snow Patrol and was produced by longtime producer Jacknife Lee, who has previously produced albums for Bloc Party, R.E.M., and U2. The songs were recorded through the summer of 2008 in Hansa Studios in Berlin and Grouse Lodge Studios in Ireland.

== Recording and production ==
"There were so many lines with big penstrokes through in my notebook."

— Gary Lightbody, on how distressing the songwriting sessions were

The band wanted to make an album more quickly than they had done the last time. By the time Snow Patrol ended their Eyes Open Tour, Lightbody had approximately 220 songs written on GarageBand. During the recording process, the band narrowed them down to approximately 30 songs, of which about 20 were eventually recorded. Apart from Lightbody, Nathan Connolly and Paul Wilson had written songs as well. The band listened to albums from artists like Fleet Foxes, Wolf Parade and Sigur Rós during the process.

In an interview after the Eyes Open Tour, it became known that the band wished to record their next studio album amidst "sun-drenched" surroundings. Band members Quinn and Simpson mentioned Hawaii and Brazil as possible locations. The album was finally recorded in two studios, Hansa Studios in Berlin and Grouse Lodge Studio in County Westmeath, Ireland through the Summer of 2008, with producer Garret "Jacknife" Lee. The album was a departure from Snow Patrol's earlier productions. Lightbody said he wanted to make a record cheerful as compared to their previous albums. Instead of describing a relationship's end, the record was written in perspective of a relationship that is working. The band members took additional lessons before starting the recording. They have described the album as their best to date. Lightbody commented that he encountered a writer's block while writing the album. He further explained: On previous albums, his focus was on his past mistakes, though this time he had forced himself to write about being in love without sounding clichéd. The lyrics did not come naturally to him, and although the songwriting sessions were distressing, he has said the lyrics were "honest". The recording sessions were hampered by bats invading the studio at dusk, when they'd fly around constantly outside the windows. Lightbody said that he once found one in his room.

== Release ==
The album title was revealed by drummer Jonny Quinn in an interview to The Belfast Telegraph, and was initially reported as "One Hundred Million Suns". Lightbody later confirmed the title as "A Hundred Million Suns" on the band's official website, and noted that the newspaper had gone on to print the title despite the band's wish to reveal it themselves.

A Hundred Million Suns was made available in three different formats, standard CD, LP Vinyl, digital download. There was also a deluxe version including a specially produced DVD directed by James Russell and full color book

The first single taken from the album, "Take Back the City" premiered on Zane Lowe's show on BBC Radio 1 on 1 September at 7:20 pm. The title of the album was revealed on 1 August and the final track listing for the album was officially revealed on Snow Patrol's website on 29 August. In early October, almost a month before the release of the album, exclusive listening parties were organized and fans were invited on a first come, first served basis. Three days before the album was officially released, the band's website put up the whole album for online playback. A section featuring Gary Lightbody and his thoughts on the new songs was also put up. The album artwork was designed by Farrow Design. The use of handwriting on the album and single sleeves was the band's idea.

Snow Patrol also teamed up with Apple Inc. and became the first band to have an interactive application for the iPhone and iPod Touch. The free digital application enabled users to access extra content like lyrics, behind-the-scenes images and exclusive album related artwork.

== Reception ==
Professional ratings
Aggregate scores
Source	Rating
Metacritic	67/100
Review scores
Source	Rating
Allmusic	4/5 stars
The A.V. Club	A
Entertainment Weekly	B+
The Independent	3/5 stars
Los Angeles Times	3/4 stars
NME	4/10
Pitchfork Media	4.9/10
PopMatters	9/10
Rolling Stone	3/5 stars
Spin	3.5/5 stars

A Hundred Million Suns received generally positive reviews from critics. The A.V. Club's Chris Mincher called it sincere and effortless, and praised it for employing the use of various techniques, citing the use of glockenspiel, tap dancing and Mongolian folk. He said that the album was Snow Patrol's "solid reminder" of "how simple it can be to make good music" and praised the album, calling it the band's most genuine and biggest yet. He called the guitar hooks "swelling" and "urgent" and called the choruses "compelling" and "soaring". He had praise for songs like "Lifeboats", which he called "coolly slick", he praised the "guitar-buzzing pump" of "Engines". He mentioned "The Golden Floor", which employs fingerpicking and "a scratchy persuasive thump"; he praised Lightbody vocals, calling them "restrained" and "seeping". Though he felt the songs were not arena rock, the band's "sincerity and effortless songwriting" would make them work individually as well as in stadiums. He still felt that critics blasting the band were likely to do the same to A Hundred Million Suns, though he felt "novel" that the album retained the band's passion they have always had. PopMatters' Ross Langager, who gave the album a rating of 9 out of 10 defended the band on the comparisons made with Coldplay, saying that the band are more focused. He compared Lightbody and Coldplay's Chris Martin, saying Lightbody's lyrics are "finely-observed", whereas Martin prefers "scrubbed-up existential clichés". He further praised Lightbody, calling him a romantic, calling his words "sturdily poetic and subtly evocative". He felt credit was due to the band for avoiding the formula of "Run" and "Chasing Cars" on A Hundred Million Suns. He credited producer Jacknife Lee with improving and expanding the band's sound. He had much praise for the songs, saying the "highlights keep flowing into each other". He called "The Planets Bend Between Us" the "Chasing Cars" moment of the album, and wrote that it perfectly captured separation by an ocean. The album's closer, the sixteen-minute "The Lightning Strike" was compared with the "grand climax" of "Open Your Eyes" on the previous album, Eyes Open (2006).

Pitchfork Media's Joshua Love derided the band's music (on previous albums, Final Straw (2003) and Eyes Open) as "soaring sissy-rock" and said it came easy to them. He felt if A Hundred Million Suns had any hits, they are within the first eight minutes; he praised the opener, "If There's a Rocket Tie Me to It", saying it captured the band at their best. However, he found some of Lightbody's lyrics "cringe-worthy". The album, which contains many metaphors referencing planets and cosmology, was slammed by him as "bullshit". He further said the band's other efforts on the album like "The Golden Floor", "Engines", "Set Down Your Glass", and "Take Back the City" fail to "strut", something they appear wanting to do. He finally wrote that the album sounded as if the band was "striving to be taken more seriously", which they did in "simply stringing together three ponderous, already-overlong songs and calling the impenetrable result a 16-minute stand-alone epic ("The Lightning Strike")". He felt the band was not talented enough to give justice to more "artful ambitions" like "The Lightning Strike". He graded the album 4.9 out of 10. Paste Magazine's Austin Ray was not pleased with the album, and called it "A Hundred Million Yawns". He found that listening to Lightbody's voice was a reminder that it was the unavoidable time to hear the band's "new batch of soundtrackable mush". He called the band "bubonic plague of alt. rock, omnipresent and poisonous", though he clarified that he had nothing personal against the band members. He found the album sleep-inducing, and cited the lyrics 'I wanna bathe you in the light of day/and just watch you as the rays/tangle up around your face and body... the daylight seems to want you/just as much as I want you' as such. He felt that the sentiment felt like it had originated in a junior-high diary and was never used. According to review aggregator website Metacritic, the album has an average score of 67 out of 100, which indicates "generally favorable reviews".

A Hundred Million Suns was a moderate chart success. It charted in 12 different countries and stayed in the charts for a total of 165 weeks. However, compared to the previous albums Eyes Open and Final Straw, it was the least successful commercially, staying the fewest weeks on chart. The album debuted at #2 in the UK with sales of 100,330. It narrowly missed reaching the top spot, being beaten by Pink's album Funhouse. It, however topped the Irish Charts, staying there for two weeks. The album reached the Top 10 in a further five countries. The interactive iPhone application was well received, and was downloaded more than 30,000 times in its first week. The album has been certified Gold in Australia, Platinum in the UK and 3× Platinum in Ireland.

The track, "What If This Storm Ends?" was used as a single for the band's second compilation album, Greatest Hits (2013).

== Taking Back the Cities Tour ==
On 3 October 2008, Snow Patrol announced their "Taking Back the Cities Tour". The band played in four capital cities in a 48-hour period. The tour began on 26 October at Gate Theatre in Dublin and ended next day in Bloomsbury Theatre in London. The band also played a small acoustic set in their living room as a part of Jo Whiley's Live Lounge on tour on 23 September. The band appeared on Later... with Jools Holland, performing "Take Back the City", "If There's a Rocket Tie Me to It", and "What If This Storm Ends?".

The band next headlined a major UK and Ireland tour in the early 2009. The tour kicked off in Bournemouth on 22 February and commenced in Belfast on 20 March. Numerous support acts hand-picked by the band became opening acts to these shows. In November, the band visited Australia to headline the V Festival. The band then visited South Africa to headline the Coca-Cola Zero Festival. The band is now in Europe to begin a European leg of the tour which will see the band visit countries like Sweden, Germany, Austria, Denmark, Switzerland and France. Snow Patrol also supported Coldplay on their Viva la Vida Tour in June and U2 on their U2 360° Tour in July. The band began a headlining tour in September 2009, which saw them visit North America.

== Track listing ==
All lyrics are written by Gary Lightbody; all music is composed by Snow Patrol.

No.	Title	Length
1.	"If There's a Rocket Tie Me to It"	4:19
2.	"Crack the Shutters"	3:20
3.	"Take Back the City"	4:40
4.	"Lifeboats"	4:41
5.	"The Golden Floor"	3:19
6.	"Please Just Take These Photos from My Hands"	4:25
7.	"Set Down Your Glass"	3:43
8.	"The Planets Bend Between Us"	4:18
9.	"Engines"	5:10
10.	"Disaster Button"	3:58
11.	"The Lightning Strike; I. What If This Storm Ends? II. The Sunlight Through the Flags; III. Daybreak"	16:18

Deluxe edition bonus DVD
No.	Title	Length
1.	"First Week of Term"	32:45
2.	"Jacknife Lee's Studio Safari"	8:51

Tour edition bonus DVD
No.	Title	Length
1.	"Take Back the City" (video)
2.	"Crack the Shutters" (video)
3.	"If There's a Rocket Tie Me to It" (video)

== Personnel ==
Snow Patrol

- Gary Lightbody – vocals, guitar, backing vocals
- Nathan Connolly – guitar, backing vocals
- Paul Wilson – bass guitar, backing vocals
- Jonny Quinn – drums, percussion
- Tom Simpson – keyboards, samples

Other personnel

- James "Big Jim" Anderson – tuba
- Stephen Wick – tuba
- John Barclay – trumpet
- Guy Barker – trumpet
- Pat White – trumpet
- Richard Bayliss – horns
- Evgeny Chebykin – horns
- Jocelyn Lightfoot – horns
- Timothy Brown – horns
- Kira Doherty – horns
- Philip Eastop – horns
- Avshalom Caspi – brass arrangement
- Ian Fasham – bass trombone
- David A. Stewart – bass trombone
- Dan Jenkins – trombone
- Colin Sheen – trombone
- Sam Bell – engineer, editing
- Tom McFall – engineer
- Philip Rose – engineer
- Tilmann Ilse – assistant engineer
- Karen Kelleher – assistant engineer
- Owen Lewis – assistant engineer
- James Jarvis – choir director
- John Ross – photography
- John C.F. Davis – mastering
- Hilary Skewes – contractor
- Cenzo Townshend – mixing
- Neil Comber – mixing assistant
- Dave Emery – mixing assistant
- Jacknife Lee – guitar, keyboards, programming, producer, glass harmonica, mixing

== Charts ==
=== Weekly charts ===
Chart (2008)	Peak position
Australian Albums (ARIA)	6
Austrian Albums (Ö3 Austria)	17
Belgian Albums (Ultratop Flanders)	16
Belgian Albums (Ultratop Wallonia)	37
Canadian Albums (Billboard)	9
Dutch Albums (Album Top 100)	8
French Albums (SNEP)	69
German Albums (Offizielle Top 100)	14
Irish Albums (IRMA)	1
New Zealand Albums (RMNZ)	6
Scottish Albums (Official Charts)	2
Swiss Albums (Schweizer Hitparade)	7
UK Albums (Official Charts)	2
US Billboard 200	9
US Top Rock Albums (Billboard)	2

=== Year-end charts ===
Chart (2008)	Position
Australian Albums (ARIA)	70
Dutch Albums (Album Top 100)	86
Irish Albums (IRMA)	18
UK Albums (OCC)	18

Chart (2009)	Position
Dutch Albums (Album Top 100)	52
UK Albums (OCC)	135

== Certifications ==
Certifications and sales for A Hundred Million Suns
Region	Certification	Certified units/sales
Australia (ARIA)	Gold	35,000^{^}
Germany (BVMI)	Gold	100,000^{^}
Ireland (IRMA)	3× Platinum	45,000^{^}
Netherlands (NVPI)	Gold	30,000^{^}
United Kingdom (BPI)	Platinum	300,000^{^}
United States	—	210,000
^{*} Sales figures based on certification alone.^{^} Shipments figures based on certification alone.^{‡} Sales+streaming figures based on certification alone.

== Release history ==
Country/Region	Date	Format
Ireland	24 October 2008	Compact disc, Vinyl, Digital download, CD+DVD
Australia	25 October 2008	Compact disc, Vinyl, Digital download, CD+DVD
United Kingdom	27 October 2008	Compact disc, Vinyl, Digital download, CD+DVD
Worldwide	28 October 2008	Compact disc, Vinyl, Digital download, CD+DVD
