= Patricia Quinn =

Northern Irish actress and singer (born 1944)

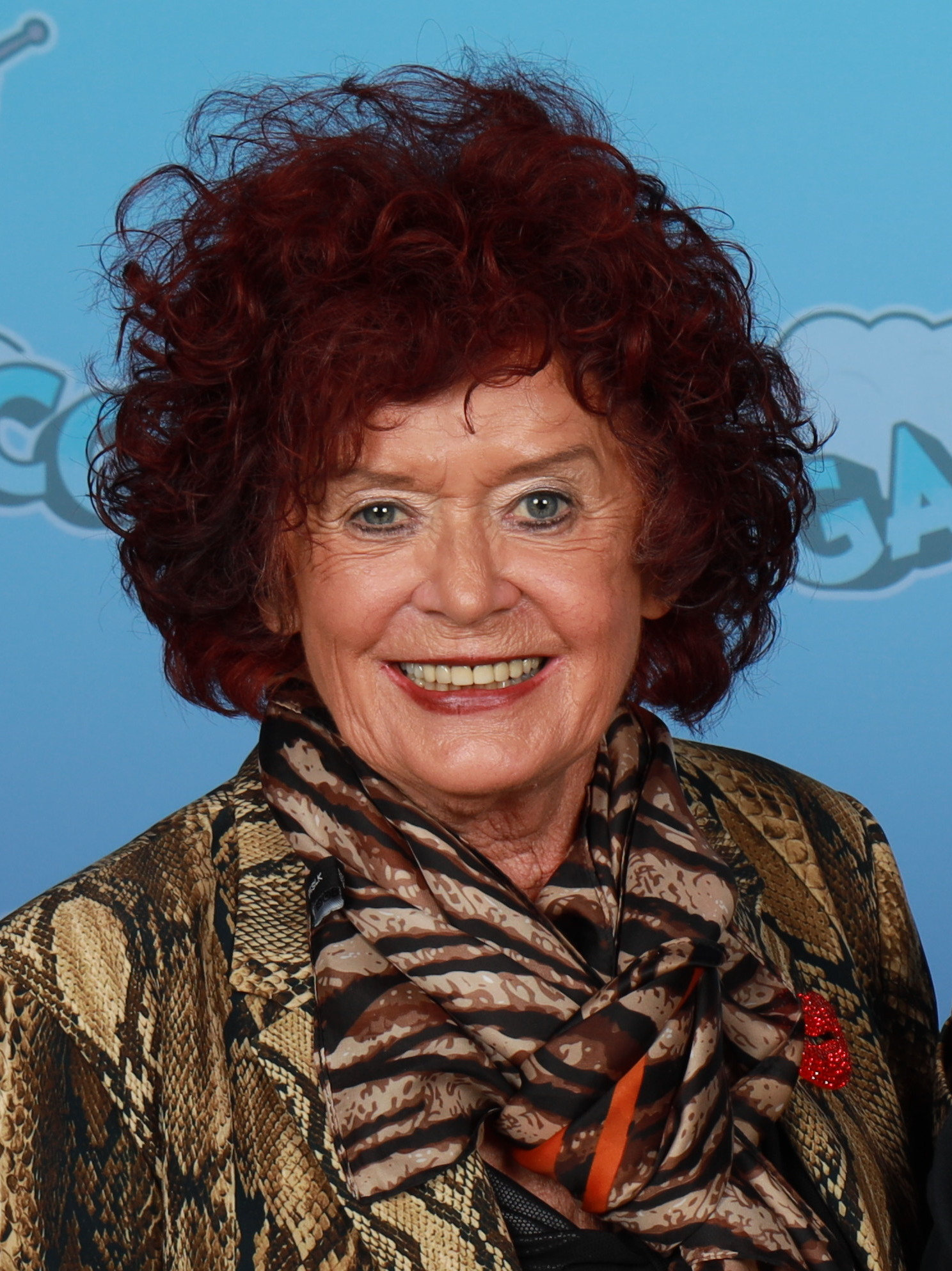
- Quinn at GalaxyCon Raleigh in 2025
- Born: 28 May 1944 (age 82); Belfast, Northern Ireland
- Education: Drama Centre London
- Occupations: Actress; singer
- Years active: 1971–present
- Known for: Playing Magenta in The Rocky Horror Show and The Rocky Horror Picture Show.
- Spouses: Don Hawkins (m. 1963; div. 1975) Robert Stephens (m. 1995; died 1995)
- Children: 1
- Relatives: Jonny and Bradley Quinn (nephews)
- Website: patriciaquinn.co.uk

Patricia Quinn, Lady Stephens (born 28 May 1944) is an actress and singer from Northern Ireland. She is best known for her role as Magenta in the 1975 cult classic musical film The Rocky Horror Picture Show, and the original stage play from which it was adapted. She appeared as Dr. Nation McKinley in its 1981 follow-up Shock Treatment.

== Early life and education ==
Quinn was born in Belfast, Northern Ireland, to James Connolly Quinn, a bookmaker, and his wife Rebecca. She has an older brother and a younger sister. She attended the Princess Gardens Grammar School, where she developed an early talent for acting. Following stints at Belfast's Arts Theatre and British Drama League, she left for London aged 17. In 1969, she trained at the Drama Centre London while simultaneously working as a blackjack-dealing Bunny at the Playboy Club in Mayfair. In 1971, she was in repertory for six months with the Citizens Theatre in Glasgow.

== Career ==
Quinn is known primarily for her role as Magenta in The Rocky Horror Picture Show (1975). In the film's opening title sequence, the movements of her disembodied lips are synchronised with the lyrics of the title song, "Science Fiction/Double Feature" (the singing voice is that of scriptwriter and actor Richard O'Brien).

She played Elizabeth Siddal in the 1975 mini series The Love School. In I, Claudius (1976), she took the role of the Emperor Claudius' sister Livilla. She also played Isla in The Professionals episode "Look After Annie" in 1978. Her other film and TV roles include the semi-sequel to The Rocky Horror Picture Show, Shock Treatment. She played "Woman" in Hawk the Slayer (1980). She appeared in the Hammer House of Horror episode "Witching Time" as Lucinda Jessop (1981), Monty Python's The Meaning of Life (1983), and the 1987 Doctor Who serial Dragonfire. Her latest film credit is Rob Zombie's The Lords of Salem (2012).

In 2000, Quinn recorded the song "Guts To Dream" with London-based band The Grand. The song was due to form part of an EP titled Open Displays of Affection, but the group had disbanded before it was released. Quinn gave a copy of the unreleased CD to the winner of a Magenta costume contest at the Rocky Horror Picture Show 25th Anniversary Convention in Las Vegas.

In 2002, she returned to Doctor Who, playing an alien queen in the audio play Bang-Bang-a-Boom!. In September 2006, she relaunched her career as a DJ and club kitten, hosting the monthly "Club Myra" night at various venues in Central London. In April 2007, she joined Patrick Wolf at a concert in London, singing "Accident and Emergency".

In October 2008, Quinn made a guest appearance in a production of The Rocky Horror Picture Show in New York City, participating in a question-and-answer session as well as unexpectedly performing "Science Fiction/Double Feature". She attended a Rocky Horror Picture Show convention in Atlantic City, New Jersey in July 2011, answering questions as well as introducing a performance of the show, staged at the House of Blues.

In 2012, Quinn played the role of Megan in the horror film The Lords of Salem.

In May 2013, she served as the honorary Master of Ceremonies for a Rocky Horror Picture Show performance at the Dallas based Texas Frightmare Weekend horror convention. That same month, she was the guest of honour at a "40th Anniversary Tribute Concert" to the original Rocky Horror Show stage production, hosted at the Victoria Theatre in San Francisco, California by local drag celebrity Peaches Christ. During the tribute conference, Quinn performed "Science Fiction/Double Feature", answered questions on stage with Christ, and signed autographs for the audience.

In 2020, Quinn was impersonated by drag performer Aiden Zhane on the twelfth season of the reality competition television series RuPaul's Drag Race as part of the Snatch Game challenge. The show's judges criticised Zhane for portraying Quinn as forgetful and neglecting to employ a Northern Irish accent, and she was eliminated following her performance in the challenge. Quinn released a statement following the episode that she was "disgusted beyond belief" at the impersonation: "I did not respect being described as a ‘old cookie woman’ or being depicted as a washed-up actress who has taken too many drugs". She expressed a wish that Zhane had given her "the common courtesy of a 'heads up'" before the episode aired.

== Personal life ==
Quinn has a son from her first marriage to Don Hawkins. Her nephews are Jonny Quinn and Bradley Quinn.

In January 1995, Quinn married the actor Sir Robert Stephens, who died in November that year. Quinn thus became the stepmother of Toby Stephens and Chris Larkin, Stephens' two actor sons from his previous marriage to Maggie Smith. Quinn had previously appeared alongside Robert Stephens in the BBC TV adaptation of The Box of Delights (1984) in the role of Sylvia Daisy Pouncer and had played his on-screen wife in the serial Fortunes of War (1987). The elder Stephens had been knighted prior to his death, giving Quinn the title of Lady Stephens.

== Partial stage credits ==
Year	Title	Role(s)	Venue
1970	AC/DC	Melody	Theatre Upstairs at the Royal Court
1972	The Threepenny Opera	Dolly	Prince of Wales Theatre
1972	The Threepenny Opera	Dolly	Piccadilly Theatre
1973	The Rocky Horror Show	Magenta	Theatre Upstairs at the Royal Court
1975	Murderer	Millie Sykes	UK tour
1976	Macbeth		Bristol Old Vic
1985	Light Up the Sky	Ms Lowell	The Old Vic
1985	Light Up the Sky	Ms Lowell	Thorndike Theatre, Leatherhead
1985	Uncle Vanya		Redgrave Theatre, Farnham
1989	Women Beware Women	Livia	Birmingham Repertory Theatre
1989	A Small Family Business	Anita McCracken	Birmingham Repertory Theatre
1994-95	The Rocky Horror Show	Magenta, Usherette	UK tour
2006	The Rocky Horror Show	Magenta, Usherette	Royal Court Theatre

== Filmography ==
=== Film ===
Year	Title	Role	Notes
1972	Up the Front	Magda	
1972	Rentadick	Chauffeuse	
1972	The Alf Garnett Saga	Jim's girlfriend	
1973	Adolf Hitler: My Part in His Downfall	Second girl at dance	
1975	The Rocky Horror Picture Show	Magenta	
1976	Sebastiane	Emperor's guest	Uncredited
1980	The Outsider	Siobhan	
1981	Hawk the Slayer	The Sorceress	
1981	Shock Treatment	Dr Nation McKinley	
1983	Monty Python's The Meaning of Life	Mrs Williams	
1995	England, My England	Elizabeth Purcell	
2010	Your Number's Up	—N/a	Short film
2010	Tamara Drewe	Posh Hippy	
2011	Mary Horror	Madam Ruth	
2012	The Lords of Salem	Megan	
2013	Yurei No Henka	Godmother	Short film

=== Television ===
Year	Title	Role	Notes
1969	Parkin's Patch	Sylvia	Episode: "Dead or Alive?"
1972	Van der Valk	Yvonne	Episode: "Destroying Angel"
1972	Villains	Dorothy	Episode: "Grass"
1972	ITV Sunday Night Theatre	Cynthia	Episode: "Ted"
1972	The Fenn Street Gang	Rona	Episode: "The Left Hand Path"
1973	Armchair Theatre	Maggie	Episode: "That Sinking Feeling"
1974	Shoulder to Shoulder	Christabel Pankhurst	6 episodes
1975	The Love School	Lizzie Siddal	3 episodes
1976	I, Claudius	Livilla	4 episodes
1977	Leap in the Dark	Rosalind Toynbee	Episode: "Parlour Games"
1977	A Christmas Carol	Ghost of Christmas Past	Television film
1978	The Professionals	Isla	Episode: "Look After Annie"
1978	Clouds of Glory	Annette Vallo	Episode: "William and Dorothy"
1980	Tales of the Unexpected	Phyl Tinker	Episode: "The Stinker"
1980	Fox	Liz	2 episodes
1980	Hammer House of Horror	Lucinda Jessop	Episode: "Witching Time"
1982	Minder	Monica	Episode: "Rembrandt Doesn't Live Here Anymore"
1983	Good Behaviour	Rose	2 episodes
1984	The Box of Delights	Sylvia Daisy Pouncer	4 episodes
1986	Lost Empires	Doris Tingley	2 episodes
1987	Fortunes of War	Mona Castlebar	2 episodes
1987	Doctor Who	Belazs	2 episodes: "Dragonfire"
1988	Bergerac	Dolly Hayward	Episode: "Crossed Swords"
1991	The Bill	Susan White	Episode: "Downtime"
1992	Screenplay	Margot	Episode: "The Countess Alice"
1999	Behind the Music	Herself	Episode: "The Rocky Horror Picture Show"
