= Sounds Under Radio =

US musical group

- Also known as: SUR
- Origin: Austin, Texas, United States
- Genre: Alternative rock
- Members: Lang Freeman; Bradley Oliver; Doug Wilson; Sonny Sanchez

Sounds Under Radio are an alternative rock band from Austin, Texas featuring Lang Freeman (vocals, guitar), Bradley Oliver (bass, keyboard), Doug Wilson (guitar), and Sonny Sanchez (drums). The song "Portrait of a Summer Thief" was written by Danny Elfman and featured on the Spider-Man 3 soundtrack. Their first LP, Cinematica was released on October 14, 2008.

A second LP, Where My Communist Heart Meets My Capitalist Mind was released on May 3, 2011.

== Formation ==
Members Lang Freeman, Bradley Oliver, Sonny Sanchez and Doug Wilson, first began to collaborate in mid-2005. In 2008, following a release from a contract with Epic Records, the band self-released Cinematica. The group later released Where My Communist Heart Meets My Capitalist Mind under MUB Records using EMI for distribution.

== Reception ==
Because Cinematica was self-released, professional reviews online for the album are difficult to find. As a result, the title (as well as the band) does not appear at this time on Metacritic's database.

For their sophomore LP, Sounds Under Radio had a favorable review from AltSounds who said that they can "craft ambitious, blood throbbing, battered populist anthems for the post-industrial age and beyond that make us want to pump our fists in the air and sing along to the surge of rising emotion." Where My Communist Heart... also received a mixed review from Austin Chronicle, and a negative review from Hannah Epstein who stated that while the album is good, it "lacks a certain rawness and power that separate it from bands like Muse and Paramore", and later said that "Songs like 'The Arsonist' are decent rock songs, but are derivative and bring nothing special to the table."

== Use in other media ==
Since 2007 the band has found placements in Spider-Man 3 (Sony Pictures), The Wolfman (Universal Pictures), War Games: The Dead Code (MGM Pictures) and most recently in the CW's The Vampire Diaries.
