= Take Back the City =

2008 single by Snow Patrol

- CD single

Single by Snow Patrol

from the album A Hundred Million Suns
- B-side: "The Afterlife"
- Released: 5 October 2008
- Studio: Grouse Lodge (County Westmeath, Ireland); Hansa Tonstudio (Berlin, Germany)
- Genre: Alternative rock; power pop
- Length: 4:40
- Label: Fiction; Interscope
- Songwriters: Gary Lightbody; Nathan Connolly; Paul Wilson; Jonny Quinn; Tom Simpson
- Producer: Jacknife Lee

Snow Patrol singles chronology
"Signal Fire" (2007)	"Take Back the City" (2008)	"Crack the Shutters" (2008)

Music video
- "Take Back the City" on YouTube

"Take Back the City" is a song by Northern Irish alternative rock band Snow Patrol, released in different regions on different dates in October 2008 as the lead single of their fifth album, A Hundred Million Suns (2008). The lyrics were written by Gary Lightbody and the music was composed by Snow Patrol. The song has positive lyrics, and is about Lightbody's love for Belfast. The song has been officially remixed once, by Lillica Libertine, and it appeared as a B-side to the single.

The single received mixed reviews, and was generally not considered Snow Patrol's return to form. Critics were generally displeased with how similar the song sounded to the songs on the band's previous album, Eyes Open (2006) when the band was claiming that the new album was a departure from their earlier work. The lyrics, though, were praised for their depth. The single was quite successful in the charts, charting in the Top 5 in Ireland and Top 10 in the UK. The single also appeared in the Top 40 in a further five countries. Furthermore, it topped the Triple A chart in the US, a feat which would later be achieved by "Crack the Shutters".

== Background ==
At the time of the release of the album, SP.com posted a section featuring lead singer and lyricist Gary Lightbody discussing the new songs, which was initially a Lightbody interview to RTÉ. About "Take Back the City", he said that though the song was inspired by Belfast and Northern Ireland in general, it applied to every other city and the relationship its inhabitants have with it. He said that it's "about the reasons why I grew up confused by my country and the reasons now why I love it so". Lightbody, who grew up in Belfast added that our native place has a big hand in what we became. Lightbody has also mentioned that the "rawness of the song came from Hansa and Berlin".

In an interview to Q in November 2008, Lightbody commented that the song was about his love for the place (Belfast) rather than the conflicts that have taken place. He shed light on the lyrics. The lyric "All these years later and it's killing me/Your broken records and words" refers to the city's past and the phrase "broken records and words" is a metaphor for "the politicians saying no". Lightbody added the after-effects of the past could still be seen in the city, but it's advancing rapidly, and it's a "fully functional, vibrant, European city these days". The phrase "pick a side, pick a fight, but get your epitaph right" is about how Lightbody doesn't understand why the conflict was taking place. He didn't understand why anyone would want to fight. He added that "I'm not fighting anyone for anything, because I don't hate anyone". "I love this city tonight, I love this city always/It bares its teeth like a light, and spits me out after days" is about the city's buzzing music scene. Lightbody revealed that he was always discovering new bands. The lyric "Tell me you never wanted more than this/And I will stop talking now" was a kind of lyric Lighbody said would be present in every song he'd write. He said that the song becomes a "modern love story in the blink of an eye" because of it. He further commented that the whole album was about being in love, and admitted it was a change in style for him.

In another interview for The Sunday Times, Lightbody stated that the "song's spiky solo and chunky chord work were inspired by old Tom Petty and Cars records". He added that though the band preferred to write about current events, they seldom liked to "luxuriate in the past". Bruce Springsteen was also an influence, as the band were listening to his work at the time of recording the album.

== Promotion and release ==
The band organized a competition for fans in the United States to make a video about their city, with guitarist Nathan Connolly appearing in a video announcing the competition. Videos were to be uploaded to a group specially created for the competition on YouTube. One person could enter one video only, and to do this, a space of one month was provided - from 10 November 2008 12:01 a.m. PST to 10 December 2008 11:59 p.m. PST. The band/label selected the winners, who were notified through phone/e-mail.

The single was first played on the air on Zane Lowe's radio show on BBC Radio 1. Snow Patrol appeared on Channel 4's show T4 to perform the song on 5 October. A day after the single was released in the UK, the band appeared on Later... with Jools Holland, to perform a few tracks for the then upcoming album (including "Take Back the City"). The show saw the band appear alongside Tom Jones, Eliza Carthy, Norma Waterson and Friendly Fires. Additionally, the song made it to BBC Radio 1 and BBC Radio 2's A list, and subsequently got played twenty times a week. The song was released as a downloadable track for the Rock Band series. The song has also been featured on the Gossip Girl episode "Chuck in Real Life", which aired on 20 October 2008. The track featured on the compilation Now That's What I Call Music! 71.

The song was released digitally worldwide through iTunes, with a digital single released on 5 October. The single was released on the German iTunes on 10 October. Physically, the single was released in Ireland, Germany and Belgium on 10 October, in the UK and Rest of Europe on 13 October, and in Australia on 11 October. The single was released in two formats, CD and 7-inch vinyl and saw a limited release. They were made available in shops for a week, and could be purchased from the online SP store or HMV. The 7-inch single had two versions, one containing a live version of "Set the Fire to the Third Bar" and the other containing a "Lillica Libertine Remix" of "Take Back the City" as a B-side. At the SP store, all three singles could be bought as a bundle for £5. The CD single was backed by the previously unreleased B-side "The Afterlife". In the Netherlands, the single was released on 17 October.

== Music video ==
The pub scene that features fans of the band.

The music video was filmed in the now derelict Millennium Mills in London Docklands, East London and was produced by Paul Weston. Alex Courtes, who has previously directed the music video for "Seven Nation Army" by The White Stripes, directed it. It premiered on Yahoo! Music on 24 September 2008. The band invited fans in the age bracket of 18–35 to be a part of the video as extras. Interested people were required to email their details and photograph to the production company Partizan. The ones chosen were utilized for the pub scene, and scenes were shot on 11 August 2008 after midnight. The video was described by RockTog magazine as a "fast paced, headache inducing visual spectacle", but it criticized it for featuring lead singer Gary Lightbody over the other band members.

The video is stop-motion shots of London skyscrapers and Gary Lightbody walking through the city streets, taken by the band's photographer Cedric, which are interspersed with scenes of the band performing the song on their instruments, filmed in the Millennium Mills. In a 'making of' video, Lightbody is heard saying that it "may be their best video yet".

== Reception ==
"Take Back the City" received generally mixed reviews. Daily Music Guide's James Brindle reviewed the single negatively and gave it 2 stars out of 5. He wrote that (the song) feels like Snow Patrol has run out of ideas, and the song sounded like a "re-hash" of "You're All I Have". He criticized the hook for being "average" and called the lyrics bland. He also called Lightbody's vocals banal and "more grating than usual". Yahoo! Music's Julian Marszalek wasn't too pleased either, calling the band "daddies of glum-rock". He noted the song was a faster-paced song than the band's previous work, and declared that "Gary Lightbody discovers his guitar can still be played in a vaguely meaningful manner while making a distorted noise." He went on to say the band "have discovered the majesty of rock", though "not in a Metallica kind of way", and "certainly not in the kind of way that'll clear the dinner party this will end up inevitably soundtracking, but in a nice, sensible, tuneful and tasteful way." He awarded the single 5 stars out of 10.

Alex Fletcher of Digital Spy gave the single 3 stars out of 5. He wrote "it attempts to unite the group's new-found love for all things epic and U2-ish with their scruffier indie roots." He felt the guitar was predictable, but praised the lyrics for their depth, citing "It bares its teeth like a light and spits me out after days" as an example. musicOMH's Ryan Helfland was generally pleased with the song, though he had his criticisms. He felt the track was "a continuation of, as opposed to a departure from, the band's commercially viable (yet, at times, predictable) material on über-hit Eyes Open." But he also felt that "it conjures images of fans a-plenty bouncing along with the tune's pulsating rhythm, which should be gracing arena scoreboards shortly." He also said the single would likely be succeeded by "a fit-for-primetime television ballad", and "Snow Patrol are likely on the precipice of spectator domination."

However, there were reviewers that welcomed the song. Billboard's Sven Phillip reviewed the single positively. He said that the "guitar-driven anthem begins humbly, with Bowie-ish vocals dancing over a new wave-infused folk-rock beat." He praised the build up to the refrain, and felt that it was "delivered with the kind of understatement that makes melody-focused U.K. acts so exciting." NME reviewed the single positively as well, awarding it 7 stars out of 10. It called the song "pleasing" for being "more of a glammy power-rock ballad in the vein of '80s unit-shifters Starship or Roxette", rather than being "their typical dewy-eyed simperer." It also said that "you won't admit to liking it". The Sunday Mail's Avril Cadden reviewed the single positively as well, awarding it 3 stars out of 5, but called it "nothing new or unexpected". But she felt it had "a good tune that will keep their star shining brightly and get lots of radio play." She called the chorus "big" and felt that Gary Lightbody's vocals were "affective".

The single charted in ten countries around the world. Its highest peak was number four in Ireland, where it spent a total of one week. Additionally, it spent ten weeks on the Irish Charts. In the UK, the single hit number six as their fifth UK top-10 single and stayed in the charts for eight weeks. The single is also notable for topping the Triple A chart in the United States. The next single taken from the album, "Crack the Shutters" would go on to achieve the same feat. The single hit the Top 40 in a further five countries: Australia, Belgium, New Zealand, Austria and Sweden. Till date, the single has spent a total of sixty-seven weeks on record charts around the world.

=== Accolades ===
Accolades for "Take Back the City"
Publication	Country	Accolade	Year	Rank
The Rock FM	New Zealand	The Hottest 100	2009	17

== Track listing ==
- CD single
1. "Take Back the City" – 4:40
2. "The Afterlife" – 4:03
- UK 7-inch vinyl 1

A: "Take Back the City" – 4:40
B: "Take Back the City" (Lillica Libertine Remix) – 6:07

- UK 7-inch vinyl 2

A: "Take Back the City" – 4:40
B: "Set the Fire to the Third Bar" (live; featuring Miriam Kaufmann) – 4:19

- Digital download
1. "Take Back the City" – 4:42
- Europe/Australian CD
1. "Take Back the City" – 4:40
2. "The Afterlife" – 4:03
3. "Take Back the City" (Lillica Libertine Remix) – 6:07
4. "Set the Fire to the Third Bar" (live; featuring Miriam Kaufmann) – 4:19
- UK promo CD
1. "Take Back the City" (radio edit) – 4:16
- US promo CD
1. "Take Back the City" (radio edit) – 4:16
2. "Take Back the City" – 4:40

Live track featuring Miriam Kaufmann recorded at Mencap's Little Noise Sessions at the Union Chapel, London on 25 November 2007.

== Personnel ==
Snow Patrol

- Gary Lightbody – vocals, guitar, backing vocals
- Nathan Connolly – guitar, backing vocals
- Paul Wilson – bass guitar, backing vocals
- Jonny Quinn – drums
- Tom Simpson – keyboards

Other personnel

- Jacknife Lee – producer, additional guitar
- Cenzo Townshend – mixing
- Dave Emery – mixing (assistant)
- John Davis – mastering
- John Ross – photography

== Chart performance ==
=== Weekly charts ===
Weekly chart performance for "Take Back the City"
Chart (2008)	Peak position
Australia (ARIA)	31
Austria (Ö3 Austria Top 40)	35
Belgium (Ultratop 50 Flanders)	32
Belgium (Ultratip Bubbling Under Wallonia)	9
Canada Hot 100 (Billboard)	95
European Hot 100 Singles (Billboard)	15
Euro Digital Song Sales (Billboard)	11
Germany (GfK)	42
Ireland (IRMA)	4
Netherlands (Dutch Top 40 Tipparade)	3
Netherlands (Single Top 100)	36
New Zealand (Recorded Music NZ)	33
Sweden (Sverigetopplistan)	40
Switzerland (Schweizer Hitparade)	46
UK Singles (Official Charts)	6
US Alternative Airplay (Billboard)	32
US Adult Alternative Airplay (Billboard)	1

=== Year-end charts ===
Year-end chart performance for "Take Back the City"
Chart (2008)	Position
UK Singles (OCC)	127
Chart (2009)	Position
US Adult Alternative Songs (Billboard)	33

== Certifications ==
Certifications for "Take Back the City"
Region	Certification	Certified units/sales
Australia (ARIA)	Gold	35,000^{‡}
United Kingdom (BPI)	Silver	200,000^{‡}
^{‡} Sales+streaming figures based on certification alone.

== Release history ==
Release history and formats for "Take Back the City"
Country/Region	Date	Format
Various (except Germany)	5 October 2008	iTunes
Germany	10 October 2008	iTunes
Ireland	10 October 2008	Compact disc
Germany	10 October 2008	Compact disc
Belgium	10 October 2008	Compact disc
Australia	11 October 2008	Compact disc
Europe (rest of)	13 October 2008	Compact disc
United Kingdom	13 October 2008	Compact disc, 7" vinyl
Netherlands	17 October 2008	Compact disc

== Use in We're Backin' Belfast campaign ==
In January 2013, Lightbody authorised the use of "Take Back the City" as the theme song for Backin' Belfast, a marketing campaign to encourage shoppers and diners to return to Belfast city centre after seven weeks of the Belfast City Hall flag protests.

The campaign was supported by local politicians, business owners and local media. #backinbelfast and #takebackthecity were reportedly retweeted over 1.2 million times. Stephen Magorrian, managing director of Botanic Inns noted, "There were a lot of people in the city saying to me that they came in because of the campaign".

Lightbody told The Belfast Telegraph afterwards, in response to his involvement, "I do get defensive because a lot of people have a very warped idea of what Northern Ireland is because they only see the negative stuff."
