= The Oohlas =

- Origin: Los Angeles, California, United States
- Genres: Indie rock, pop
- Years active: 2004–present
- Labels: Island Records
- Members: Mark Eklund; Olivia Stone; Greg Eklund
- Website: theoohlas.com

The Oohlas are an American rock band from Los Angeles, California formed in 2004.

== History ==
The Oohlas consist of Olivia Stone (vocals/guitar), Mark Eklund (bass/vocals), Australian, Hayden Scott (drums) and Greg Eklund (vocals/guitar). Stone moved to Los Angeles from Phoenix and met Mark, who was working for Stone's aunt. Mark introduced her to his brother Greg, who had recently left Everclear. Wasting little time, they practiced in Greg's studio and were playing in the Los Angeles area.

The band released an LP entitled Best Stop Pop on September 26, 2006, on an imprint label of Island Def Jam. In May 2007, they signed to Island Records. They released an EP entitled Chinchilla in early 2009 are on their own and are not currently signed to any record label.

The band has shared the stage with Sean Lennon, The Raveonettes, Giant Drag, Burning Brides, Carina Round, Maxïmo Park, the Duke Spirit, Men, Women & Children, Say Anything, and Bloc Party, among others.

They were featured on the soundtrack for the movie Spider-Man 3, with their song "Small Parts". A Simlish version of "Small Parts" was recorded for The Sims Pet Stories.

The band plans to release music in 2023.

== Discography ==
- September 26, 2006: Best Stop Pop
- July 24, 2007: "Small Parts"
- February 26, 2009: Chinchilla
