= Trans (festival) =

trans
- Start Something
- Genre: Arts
- Dates: July/August (Exact dates varied annually)
- Locations: Belfast; County Antrim; Northern Ireland
- Years active: 2006–2010
- Founders: Belfast Waterfront hall & Sonic DJ academy
- Website: 2012 archive of discontinued trans site

trans was an annual, non-commercial arts festival held in Belfast, Northern Ireland, linked with the Urban Arts Academy and organised by the Belfast Waterfront Hall. Over a four-week period it hosted a programme of gigs, free seminars, courses, exhibitions and broadcasts its own radio station.

== Ideology ==
trans stated a list of ideologies and beliefs:

- Investing in new technologies, new trends, new art forms and new artists.
- Providing training in career paths which the current system does not.
- Encouraging debate outside traditional politics
- Demonstrate that Urban Arts should not be confined to Youth Culture
- To bring the world to Belfast, and Belfast to the world

== History ==
The festival was originally set up in 2006, to complement the Urban Arts Academy. Its usual running dates are between the Orange Order's Orangefest and the West Belfast Feile an Phobail.

Throughout its five-year history, the festival was popular not only with the Urban Arts Academy students, but with music and arts lovers from all walks of life, and regularly attracts international artists and audience members.

In 2010 and 2011, the festival ran a spin-off winter festival Base, which was an international street art and music festival which in 2011 was headlined by Sleigh Bells and Ghostpoet.

2006	2007	2008
Annie Mac, The Crimea, V Formation, Oppenheimer Unabombers, Spree, Japanese Popstars, Simon Shelden David Kitt, Schlomo and Steinski Asian Dub Foundation Trans-Global Underground	Ashley Beedle, Foy Vance, mojoFURY, Flykkiller Thomas Truax, Beatorrent, Cat Malojian Hayseed Dixie, The Winding Stair, Hey Gringos Greg Wilson, D. Ramirez, Claude Von Stroke, Switch, Ish Freestyle theatre dance, Haggis Horns The Trans Lap-Off and Urban Market	One Man Star Wars Trilogy, Two Door Cinema Club, Andy Weatherall, Frank Turner and Los Campesinos

== Signature events ==
trans consists of signature events alongside its main events, two of which are the "Money Back Guarantee" and "The Lap-off".

Money-Back Guarantee is about breaking down barriers between the artist and the performer. The festival organisers allow the audience to pay back part of the ticket price at the end of the show, giving the audience the chance to pay each performer based on how entertaining they thought they were.

The Lap off Consists of eight laptop musicians battling it out in a competition based on their performance using electronic sampling and essentially the use of computers in music.

== Departure of organisers ==
After various charges of conflicts of interest in March 2011, the staff left. The Waterfront Hall announced it would be rebuilding with a view to concentrating on conference business.
