= Grouse Lodge =

Recording studio in Ireland

Grouse Lodge is a recording studio near Rosemount, County Westmeath, Ireland. Designed by Andy Munro, it has two studios and living quarters in nine stone outhouses, integrating the existing 275-year-old stone structure.

== Artists ==
It has recorded artists such as Westlife, Sam Fender, Bell X1, McFly ("Motion In The Ocean"), Snow Patrol (Eyes Open, A Hundred Million Suns),Editors (An End Has A Start), Bloc Party (A Weekend in the City), Laminate, Duman (Duman I and Duman II) Doves, Manic Street Preachers (tracks from their Lifeblood and Send Away The Tigers albums), Muse (Absolution) and Royseven (The Art of Insincerity) and Michael Jackson. R.E.M. used the studio to record some of Accelerate, their 14th studio album.

== Awards ==
- Irish - Winner
- World Young Business Achievers Award 2004 - Winner
