= Nathan Connolly =

Northern Irish guitarist (born 1981)

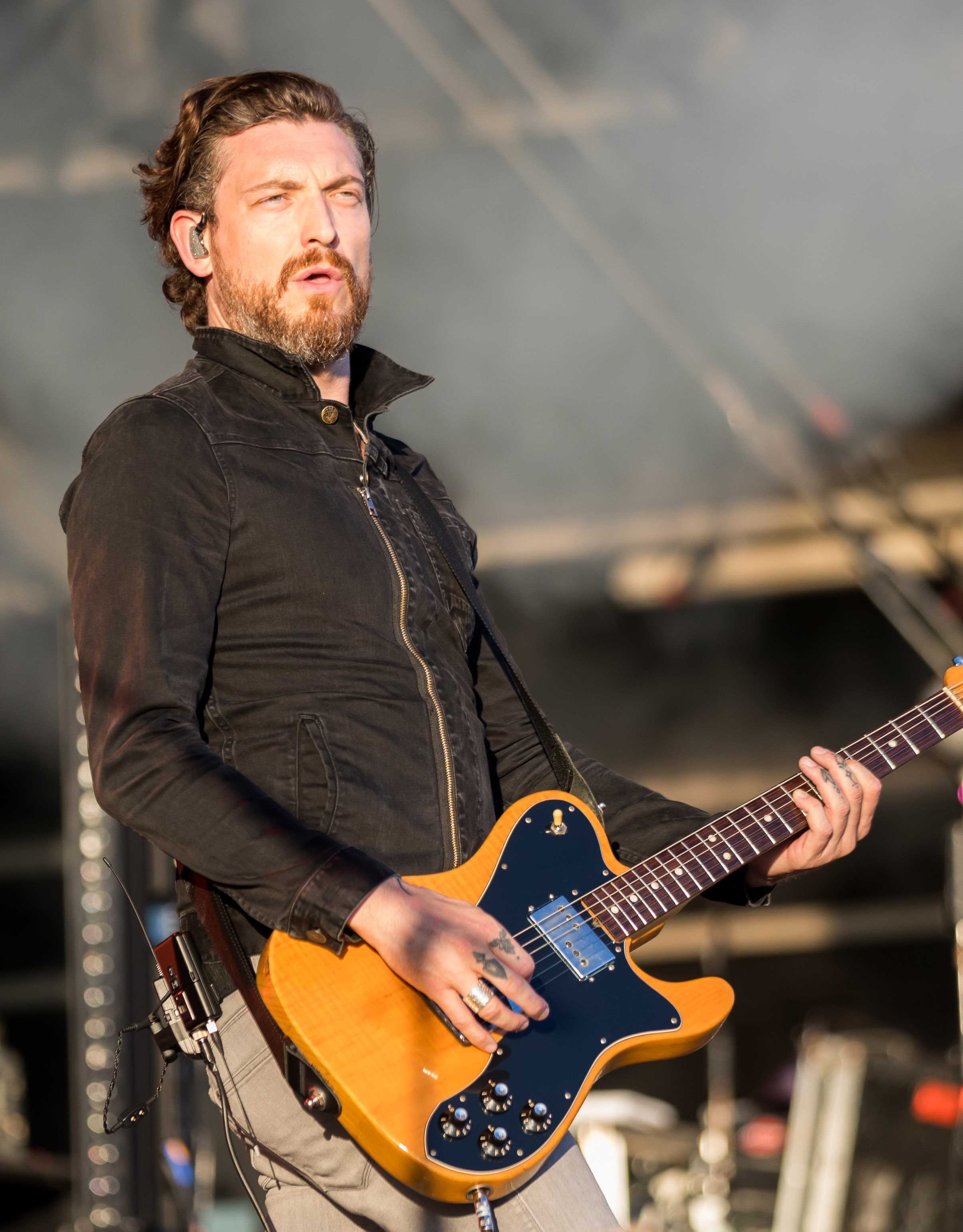
- Connolly with Snow Patrol at Rock am Ring 2018

Background information
- Born: 20 January 1981 (age 45); Belfast, Northern Ireland
- Genres: Alternative rock; indie rock
- Occupation: Guitarist
- Years active: 2002–present
- Member of: Snow Patrol

Nathan Connolly (born 20 January 1981) is a Northern Irish musician, who is best known as the lead guitarist and backing vocalist for alternative rock band Snow Patrol. He also briefly served as guitarist for Feeder in 2016, and released his debut solo album in 2023.

== Early life ==
Connolly, who was born in Belfast, sang for a gospel church choir at Glenmachan, Church of God, Belfast when he was 16, and the experience, he says, is what inspired him to be a musician.

I suppose I was always around music, and like any other kid, teenage kid, 12 or 13, I either wanted to be a pub quiz addict or a rock star and play guitar. After a particularly brutal thrashing at Scrabble, when my opponent played the word 'SCOPIE' on a triple word score, I kind of played around with it for a few years and didn’t really learn much and wasn’t very good for the first two years, but then I started a band with my cousin and two mates from school and it kind of just went on from there. I started taking it a bit more seriously. I mean, I’ve always wanted to play in a band and write music, I just didn’t realize exactly how much when I first started.

He is a former pupil of Grosvenor Grammar School.

== Musical career ==
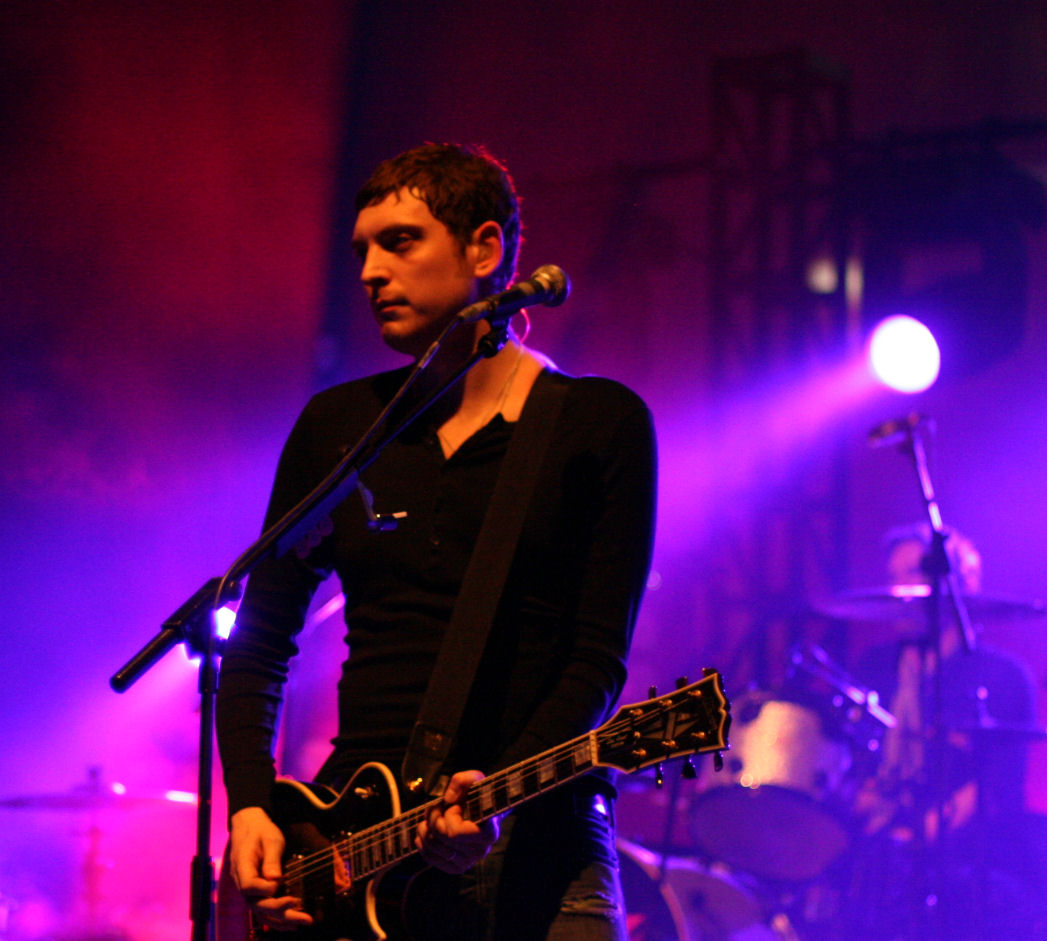
Connolly in 2008

Prior to joining Snow Patrol, Connolly was a member of a band called File Under Easy Listening (or F.U.E.L), who were managed by BBC Radio 1 DJ Colin Murray. The band consisted of Connolly, vocalist Aaron Ditty, Dave Magee and Peter Comfort. Unfortunately, it did not last long; the single "Closure/Dryform" was F.U.E.L.'s first and only release.

While working at the record store HMV in Belfast, Connolly was introduced to the band Snow Patrol. He reluctantly agreed to join, despite the fact that the band had no record deal at the time. He jokingly recalls his mother thinking he "was being kidnapped by rock stars."

Connolly became a permanent member of the band near the end of 2002. His recruitment played a large role in shaping the band's new sound. With Connolly as a composer of the band's new material, Snow Patrol garnered a new record deal and released Final Straw in 2003. The album proved to be the band's breakthrough and helped introduce them to a wide audience.

In late 2006, he talked about plans to record a solo album, which he said would be "melodic and tuneful".

In 2013, Connolly formed his own side project called Little Matador.

Connolly played with Feeder live at the Isle of Wight Festival on 12 June 2016.

On 17 March 2023, he released “Fires”, with guest star Simon Neil on vocals, as the lead single from his debut solo album The Strange Order of Things. The album was released on 21 April 2023.

== Personal life ==
Connolly lives in County Down, with his fiancé Sarah Greene. They have one son together. Greene also sang backing vocals on the 2024 Snow Patrol album The Forest Is The Path along with Courteney Cox, fiancé of Snow Patrol's Johnny McDaid.

== Equipment ==
=== Guitars ===
- Gibson Les Paul Custom – Tobacco 1979
- Gibson Les Paul Custom – Ebony (appears in the video for Take Back the City)
- Fender Telecaster Custom – Sunburst 1974
- Fender Telecaster Custom – Blonde 1977
- Gretsch Countryman – Brown 1962
- Gretsch Duo Jet – Black
- Fender Jaguar – Sunburst 1965
- Fender Telecaster Custom – Black '72 reissue
- Fender Telecaster Nashville – Sunburst
- Guild Acoustic
- Rickenbacker 360 – Jetglo
- Hutchins Memphis – Black

He uses Jim Dunlop Tortex .60mm picks

=== Amps ===
- Diamond Amplification Spitfire I Head with Spitfire 4x12 Cabinet
- Vox AC30 (Used at Mandela Hall SG#3)
- Marshall JCM800 2203 Jubilees
- Marshall 3315 Transistor (Used on Final Straw Tours)
- Fender Twin Reverb (Also Used on Final Straw Tours)

=== Effects ===
Connolly uses a setup that is primarily rack based. His rack consists of the following:

- TC Electronic D Two (for delay)
- TC Electronic G Major (for modulation, pitch shifting and compression)
- TC Electronic M One XL (for reverb and layered delay sounds)
- Voodoo Labs GCX Audio Switcher

He uses various pedals for his overdrive and boost sounds. They change from time to time, but his consistent setup includes the following:

- Ibanez TS9 Tubescreamer
- MXR/Dunlop Micro Amp (for boost)
- Boss Super Overdrive
- Boss Blues Driver

He uses a Voodoo Labs Ground Control Pro controller to bring up presets for each of the band's songs, and has the ability to add/remove different pedals and changes in sound.

He also uses a function in the TC Electronic G Major that allows him to switch the channels on his Marshall Jubilee amp heads for his heaviest sounds.

Connolly has a small pedalboard containing his ground control for the rack and various Boss pedals including a TU-2, PS-5, DD3, and RC-2.
