= Velcro Fly =

Single by ZZ Top

from the album Afterburner
- B-side: "Woke Up With Wood"
- Released: July 1986
- Recorded: 1985
- Genre: Rock
- Length: 2:50 (single version); 3:29 (album version); 6:39 (12" Extended Version)
- Label: Warner Bros.
- Songwriters: Billy Gibbons; Dusty Hill; Frank Beard
- Producer: Bill Ham

ZZ Top singles chronology
"Rough Boy" (1985)	"Velcro Fly" (1986)	"Doubleback" (1990)

"Velcro Fly" is the fourth single off ZZ Top's 1985 album Afterburner. The song peaked at number 15 on the Billboard Mainstream Rock chart, and number 35 on the Billboard Hot 100 in 1986.

== Release ==
For the single release the song was remixed in two versions: by Bill Ham and by Jellybean. Singles included both 7-inch and 12-inch edit versions of those remixes with addition of Jellybean dub mix. A 12-inch Jellybean version of the song is featured on the box set Chrome, Smoke & BBQ.

== Music video ==
The music video for "Velcro Fly" directed by Daniel Kleinman features female dancers choreographed by pop singer Paula Abdul.

The video was released on the DVD Greatest Hits: The Video Collection, along with other videos from the band's albums Eliminator and Recycler.

== Reception ==
Robert Christgau called the song a "highlight" on Afterburner. Cash Box called it a "seductive rocker that finds the 'Lil Ol' Band From Texas' in its usual tongue-in-cheek mode." Billboard called it a "techno-boogie stomper buried in fuzz and percussion."

== Charts ==
Chart (1986)	Peak position
UK Singles Chart	54
U.S. Billboard Hot 100	35
U.S. Billboard Hot Dance Club Play	43
U.S. Billboard Mainstream Rock Tracks	15

== Personnel ==
- Billy Gibbons - guitar, vocals
- Dusty Hill - keyboards
- Frank Beard - drums
