= Legs (song) =

Single by ZZ Top

from the album Eliminator
- B-side: "A Fool for Your Stockings"
- Released: 1984
- Studio: Frank Beard's home studio, Quail Valley; Ardent Studios, Memphis; Terry Manning's home studio, Memphis
- Genre: Blues rock; electronic rock; synth-pop; boogie rock; pop rock; new wave
- Length: 4:35 (original album version); 3:33 (single mix); 7:48 (dance mix); 4:31 (Greatest Hits/video version)
- Label: Warner Bros.
- Songwriters: Billy Gibbons; Dusty Hill; Frank Beard
- Producer: Bill Ham

ZZ Top singles chronology
"TV Dinners" (1983)	"Legs" (1984)	"Sleeping Bag" (1985)

"Legs" is a song by the band ZZ Top from their 1983 album Eliminator. The song was released as the fourth single in May 1984 more than a year after the album came out. It reached number 8 on the Billboard Hot 100 in the United States (their highest-charting single on the pop charts), and the dance mix version of the song peaked at number 13 on the dance charts.

A video was made for "Legs", depicting a timid young female store clerk who is given confidence by a trio of sexy women, with the band mysteriously appearing and disappearing. "Legs" was the third installment of a trilogy of similarly themed videos shot by Tim Newman for Eliminator, and it won the MTV Video Music Award for Best Group. The video was placed into heavy rotation on MTV, which helped to lift the single high on the charts.

Like other songs on Eliminator, the musical style of "Legs" shows the band's new interest in electronic music elements, driven by singer-guitarist Billy Gibbons who was pushing to incorporate new wave and synth-pop styles. Pre-production engineer Linden Hudson established the song's pulsing synthesizer line during rehearsals. "Legs" contains electric guitar and vocals from Gibbons, but the bass guitar of Dusty Hill and drums of Frank Beard were replaced in the final mix by engineer Terry Manning who played keyboard bass and drum machine to achieve the style sought by Gibbons.

== Recording ==
"Legs" – 1982 demo
The early demo version of "Legs" was recorded in 1982 by Billy Gibbons on electric guitars and vocals, Dusty Hill on bass guitar, and Frank Beard on drums. Engineer Linden Hudson programmed and played the pulsing synthesizer.

"Legs" – 1984 single
The radio version of "Legs", as released as a single in 1984, shows Gibbons playing guitar and singing above drum machine, synthesizer and bass, all programmed and played by engineer Terry Manning.

On the inspiration for the song, Billy Gibbons said, "We were driving in a rainstorm to the studio back in Texas when we spotted a woman who was getting drenched and wanted us to pull over to provide a ride. We circled back and—boom—she was gone. She had legs and knew how to use ’em!"

The band ZZ Top developed the song "Legs" at the home of drummer Frank Beard on the outskirts of Houston, Texas, in the band's rehearsal studio. The studio held recording equipment installed and operated by live-in engineer Linden Hudson. To give the song a sense of propulsion, Hudson created an unusual synthesizer sound by routing the synth's audio signal through a noise gate that was triggered externally by continual sixteenth-note hi-hat samples from a drum machine. As a result, the synthesizer chords pulsed to a sixteenth-note beat at a tempo of 125 beats per minute. Gibbons played a Dean ML guitar for both rhythm and lead parts, and sang the lead vocal part. Beard played drums, and Dusty Hill played bass guitar. Gibbons, Beard and Hill were credited on the album as songwriters.

The band recorded the Eliminator album professionally at Ardent Studios in Memphis, Tennessee, under the guidance of band manager Bill Ham and longtime band recording engineer Terry Manning. Manning phoned Hudson to ask how he had generated the pulsing synth effect. The whole band recorded their parts at Ardent, then Beard and Hill returned home to Texas.

== Music video ==
The "Legs" music video follows a mousy young female shoe store clerk who is harassed by nearly everyone around her with exceptions being an admiring cafe waiter and a group of tough looking but friendly bikers. The trio of women featured in previous music videos for Eliminator singles drives up in the vintage Eliminator car to give her confidence and take revenge on the bullies. The band shimmers in and out of visibility, spinning their sheepskin-covered guitars, while the trio pretty up her make up and attire, adding more moxie to her personality. The admiring waiter and the friendly bikers join in her concern by intimidating her former bullies. Finally ZZ Top provide the clerk the keys to the Eliminator, which she and the waiter use to race away to a new life.

=== Production ===
The "Legs" video was directed by Tim Newman, who had directed the successful videos for the Eliminator singles for "Gimme All Your Lovin'" and "Sharp Dressed Man". He declined to return to shoot the video for "TV Dinners". For "Legs", record executive Jeff Ayeroff pleaded with him to return. Newman bargained hard and asked for "points"—a percentage of the profit—but Warner feared this would set an expensive precedent. Instead, they offered Newman a fixed payment every time the album was certified for another 250,000 units sold in the US, earning Newman more money than he expected.

The "Legs" video concept started with Newman suggesting that the main character should be a young woman this time. He cast actress Wendy Frazier who had recently played the love interest in the little-seen Baxter Robertson video for the Robertson song "Silver Strand", also directed by Newman. As the crew set up to shoot the "Legs" video in February 1984, Frazier turned 21. Much of the video was shot in Valencia, California, the area now called Santa Clarita.

The three Eliminator actresses—Jeana Tomasino, Kymberly Herrin and Danièle Arnaud—were paid more than $2,000 each (approximately $5,000 in 2020 dollars), a higher fee than usual, according to Herrin. Tomasino had been a Playboy Playmate in 1980; so was Herrin in 1981. This was Herrin's first ZZ Top video, and established Eliminator models Tomasino and Arnaud tended to push her to the rear. Herrin and singer-guitarist Billy Gibbons became friends during the shoot. Gibbons said that he kept in touch with Herrin for years afterward, calling her a "groovy hippie chick from Santa Barbara". ZZ Top later brought her back for the video to their 1985 single "Sleeping Bag". Newman dated Frazier for a while, but only after she was cast in the part. He said, "Look, you spend time with these people. What can I tell you?"

The single entered the Mainstream Rock Airplay charts in June 1984.

=== Spinning guitars ===
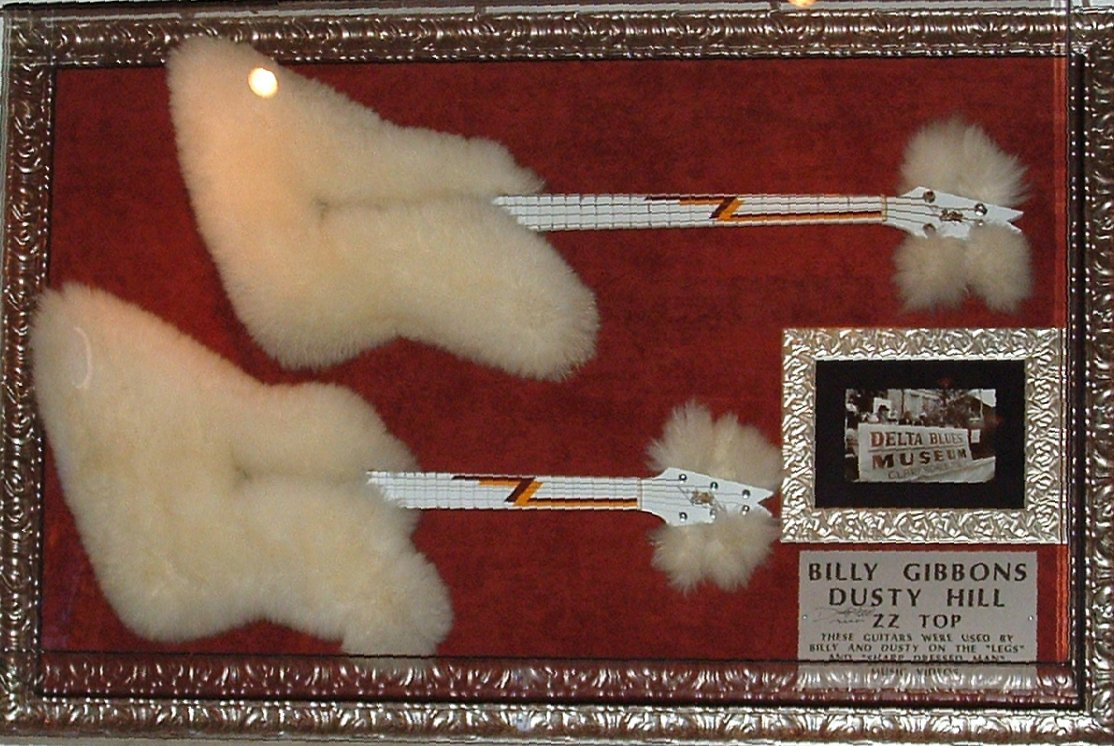
Dean guitars used in the "Legs" music video, displayed at the former Dallas Hard Rock Cafe

Dean Guitars created the pair of matching guitars shown in the music video, based on the Dean Z model, but painted white and covered in fluffy white sheepskin. Dean also painted the band's "ZZ" logo extending the length of each fretboard. Gibbons had picked up the sheepskin while touring in Scotland, and sent it to Dean for the custom project. Both the 4-string bass guitar and 6-string standard required the sheepskin to be trimmed away from the strings so that they could sustain. The glue was still drying on the sheepskin covering the tuning pegs when the guitars were couriered to the video shoot.

The custom style was duplicated in late 1985 by Gibson for the band's Afterburner Tour, based on a pair of Gibson Explorer models. Fabricated by Matthew Klein, the Gibsons were purposely made lighter in construction than the Deans, weighing about six pounds each (2.7 kg).

== Awards ==
The video won the 1984 MTV Video Music Award for Best Group Video. Frazier and Newman attended the awards ceremony, and Newman accepted the award on behalf of the band. This was the first year the award was given. Sim Sadler and Bob Sarles edited "Legs," for which both received nominations for Best Editing in the first MTV Video Music Awards, in the Billboard Music Video Awards, and in the American Music Video Awards that year.

== Chart performance ==
=== Weekly charts ===
Chart (1984–1985)	Peak position
Australia (Kent Music Report)	6
Belgium (Ultratop 50 Flanders)	27
Canada Top Singles (RPM)	9
Ireland (IRMA)	9
Netherlands (Dutch Top 40)	35
Netherlands (Single Top 100)	19
New Zealand (Recorded Music NZ)	7
UK Singles (Official Charts)	16
US Billboard Hot 100	8
US Billboard Hot Dance Club Play	13
US Cash Box	11

=== Year-end charts ===
Chart (1984)	Position
Australia (Kent Music Report)	42
Canada Top Singles (RPM)	74
US Billboard Hot 100	60
US Cash Box	72

== Personnel ==
- Billy Gibbons – guitar, lead vocals
- Terry Manning – recording and mix engineer, programming, drum machines, synthesizers, backing vocals
- Linden Hudson – pre-production engineer
- Dusty Hill – bass guitar and backing vocals (credit only)
- Frank Beard – drums (credit only)

== Cover versions ==
- The Wright Brothers Band covered the song on the soundtrack for the 1987 film Overboard.
- Nickelback covered the song on the 2011 album ZZ Top: A Tribute from Friends.
- Kid Rock covered the song on the 2002 album WWF Forceable Entry.

== Parodies ==
The video was parodied in a 1984 episode of St. Elsewhere in which the Eliminator girls appeared, though the band was played by members of the show's cast.
