= Rough Boy =

Single by ZZ Top

from the album Afterburner
- B-side: "Delirious"
- Released: March 1986
- Recorded: 1985
- Genre: Synth-rock
- Length: 4:52 (album version); 3:45 (single version)
- Label: Warner Bros.
- Songwriters: Billy Gibbons; Dusty Hill; Frank Beard
- Producer: Bill Ham

ZZ Top singles chronology
"Stages" (1985)	"Rough Boy" (1986)	"Velcro Fly" (1986)

Music video
- "Rough Boy" on YouTube

"Rough Boy" is a song by the American rock band ZZ Top. It was released by Warner Bros. Records in the US in March 1986, as the third single from their ninth studio album, Afterburner. The song reached No. 5 on the Album Rock Tracks chart and No. 22 on the Billboard Hot 100, as well as No. 23 on the UK Singles Chart. Unlike the other songs on the album, this song has a much slower tempo and is more of a power ballad. It also shares a similar tune to their song "Leila", from their seventh studio album, El Loco.

== Background ==
Dusty Hill said in 2007, "'Rough Boy' is a pretty li'l song. We're doin' it this tour. We pulled it back out. I like that song so much, I had it played at my wedding."

== Reception ==
Cash Box called it a "rapturous teen ballad" in which "the band turns its leather-tough into pure silk."

== Music video ==
The music video (directed by Steve Barron) features the band's "Eliminator" car/spaceplane hybrid (from the Afterburner album cover) visiting a space car wash, interspersed with images of the band members' hands and faces, as well as a woman's legs, protruding from metal plates, some of which double as lighted message signs or crosswalk signals.

== Charts ==
1986 weekly chart performance for "Rough Boy"
Chart (1986)	Peak position
Australia (Kent Music Report)	85
Canada Top Singles (RPM)	58
France (SNEP)	22
Ireland (IRMA)	23
UK Singles (Official Charts)	23
US Billboard Hot 100	22
US Mainstream Rock (Billboard)	5

1992 weekly chart performance for "Rough Boy"
Chart (1992)	Peak position
Australia (ARIA)	165
Netherlands (Single Top 100)	81
Switzerland (Schweizer Hitparade)	38
UK Singles (Official Charts)	49

== Personnel ==
- Billy Gibbons – guitar, lead vocals
- Dusty Hill – bass, keyboards, backing vocals
- Frank Beard – drums
