= ZZ Top: A Tribute from Friends =

Compilation album by Various artists
- Released: October 11, 2011
- Genre: Rock
- Length: 45:37
- Label: RCA
- Producer: Billy Gibbons, Dusty Hill, Frank Beard, Howard Benson

ZZ Top: A Tribute from Friends is the fourth tribute album to honor American blues-rock band ZZ Top. It includes performances from Daughtry, Nickelback, Wolfmother, Filter and Steven Tyler of Aerosmith among others.

== Background information ==
The album includes 11 cover tracks such as "Gimme All Your Lovin'," "Legs," a combination of two songs "Waitin' for the Bus"/"Jesus Just Left Chicago" and "La Grange."

== Reception ==
Professional ratings
Review scores
Source	Rating
Allmusic	2.5/5 stars
American Songwriter	2.5/5 stars
Classic Rock Revisited	B
HitFix	(mixed)
Loudwire	4/5 stars
The Oklahoman	(mixed)

Upon release, ZZ Top: A Tribute from Friends debuted at number 121 on the Billboard 200, and number 8 on the Top Hard Rock Albums, selling 4,000 copies. The album also debuted at number 151 on the Canadian Albums Chart.

== Track listing ==
No.	Title	Artists	Length
1.	"Sharp Dressed Man"	The M.O.B. (Steven Tyler, Mick Fleetwood, John McVie, Jonny Lang, Brett Tuggle)	4:03
2.	"Gimme All Your Lovin'"	Filter	3:10
3.	"Tush"	Grace Potter and the Nocturnals	2:49
4.	"Legs"	Nickelback	3:15
5.	"Cheap Sunglasses"	Wolfmother	4:14
6.	"Got Me Under Pressure"	Loaded	3:48
7.	"Beer Drinkers & Hell Raisers"	Coheed and Cambria	3:13
8.	"Just Got Paid"	Mastodon (Billy Gibbons, guitar)	3:35
9.	"Rough Boy"	Wyclef Jean	3:05
10.	"Waitin' for the Bus / Jesus Just Left Chicago"	Daughtry	6:31
11.	"La Grange"	Jamey Johnson (Billy Gibbons, vocals and guitar)	8:04
