= Sleeping Bag (song) =

Single by ZZ Top

from the album Afterburner
- B-side: "Party on the Patio"
- Released: October 1985
- Recorded: 1985
- Genre: Synth-rock
- Length: 4:03
- Label: Warner Bros.
- Songwriters: Billy Gibbons, Dusty Hill, Frank Beard
- Producer: Bill Ham

ZZ Top singles chronology
"Legs" (1984)	"Sleeping Bag" (1985)	"Stages" (1985)

Music video
- "Sleeping Bag" on YouTube

"Sleeping Bag" is a song performed by the band ZZ Top from their 1985 album Afterburner.

== Reception ==
Cash Box said that the song is a "high tech workout which makes good use of drum machines and Fairlight effects as well as the 'lil ole band from Texas' innate soul."

The song was released as a single in 1985 and became their most successful single, reaching #8 on the Billboard Hot 100 in the United States, equaling the peak of their previous single "Legs". However, unlike "Legs", it also reached No. 1 on the U.S. Mainstream Rock Tracks chart, a first for the band.

The song was featured in the 2017 film I, Tonya during an ice skating routine. The real-life Tonya Harding previously used the song in some of her actual routines.

== Track listing ==
=== 7" single ===
1. "Sleeping Bag" - 4:02
2. "Party on the Patio" - 2:48

=== 12" maxi-single ===
1. "Sleeping Bag (Extended Mix)" - 6:12
2. "Party on the Patio" - 2:48

== Music video ==
A music video directed by Steve Barron was made to promote the song. In the form of a story narrative, two thieves break into a house to recover a sack of money, but are thwarted by a young woman living in the house who runs off with the sack, meeting a young man who accompanies her on the run. After being assisted in their escape by the band members, the ZZ Top video girls and the Eliminator vehicle, the thieves are eventually arrested.

The video marks the end of the Eliminator vehicle featured in the videos from the Eliminator album (although its supposed destruction happens off-screen) and introduces the Afterburner space shuttle.

Actors Heather Langenkamp (A Nightmare on Elm Street) and John Dye (Touched by an Angel) appear as the female and male leads. Kymberly Herrin, who previously appeared in the video for "Legs," was cast again as one of the ZZ girls.

== Charts ==
Chart (1985–1986)	Peak position
Australian Kent Music Report	36
Canadian RPM Top Singles	18
German Singles Chart	40
Irish Singles Chart	14
New Zealand Singles Chart	13
Swedish Singles Chart	13
U.S. Billboard Hot 100	8
U.S. Billboard Hot Dance Club Play	41

=== Year-end charts ===
Chart (1985)	Position
U.S. Cashbox Top 100	83

Chart (1986)	Rank
US Top Pop Singles (Billboard)	80

== Personnel ==
- Billy Gibbons - guitar, vocals
- Dusty Hill - bass, keyboards
- Frank Beard - drums
