= Kymberly Herrin =

American actress, model and Playboy Playmate (1957-2022)

- Born: Kymberly Ellen Herrin; October 2, 1957; Santa Barbara County, California, U.S.
- Died: October 28, 2022 (aged 65); Santa Barbara, California, U.S.
- Occupations: Actress, model
- Years active: 1981–1990
- Known for: Ghostbusters (1984)

Kymberly Ellen Herrin (October 2, 1957 – October 28, 2022) was an American actress, model, and Playboy Playmate. She was best known for her role as the "Dream Ghost" in Ghostbusters (1984) and for appearances in films like Romancing the Stone (1984) and Beverly Hills Cop II (1987). Herrin also appeared in the music video for ZZ Top's song "Legs".

== Early life ==
Herrin was born in Santa Barbara County, California, on October 2, 1957. She was of French, Swedish and Filipino descent and graduated from Santa Barbara Senior High School in 1975. She lived most of her life in Santa Barbara.

== Career ==
=== Modeling ===
Herrin was chosen as Playboy magazine's Playmate of the Month for March 1981. Her centerfold was photographed by Arny Freytag. She later appeared on the magazine's covers in September 1982 and September 1983. In addition to her work for Playboy, she modelled for various fashion and swimwear brands, including Ralph Lauren.

=== Acting ===
Herrin gained pop-culture recognition for portraying the "Dream Ghost" in Ghostbusters (1984). That same year, she appeared as Angelina in Romancing the Stone. She also appeared in Beverly Hills Cop II (1987) in a cameo role as a Playboy Playmate. She also appeared in the films Moving Violations (1985) and Road House (1989), and was a guest on the TV series Matt Houston and St. Elsewhere.

=== Music videos ===
She appeared in the ZZ Top video for the song "Legs", one of the band's iconic MTV-era videos, as well as in their video for the song "Sleeping Bag", another top 10 video. She also appeared in the Kiss video Exposed as well as other videos.

== Personal life and death ==
Herrin lived most of her life in Santa Barbara, California. She died there on October 28, 2022, at the age of 65.

== Selected filmography ==
Year	Title	Role	Notes
1984	Ghostbusters	Dream Ghost	
1984	Romancing the Stone	Angelina	Opening sequence
1987	Beverly Hills Cop II	Playboy Playmate	Cameo

== See also ==
- List of Playboy Playmates of 1981
