= TV Dinners (song) =

Single by ZZ Top

from the album Eliminator
- B-side: "Cheap Sunglasses"
- Released: December 1983
- Recorded: 1982
- Genre: Boogie rock
- Length: 3:50 (album version); 3:24 (single version)
- Label: Warner Bros.
- Songwriters: Billy Gibbons; Dusty Hill; Frank Beard
- Producer: Bill Ham

ZZ Top singles chronology
"Sharp Dressed Man" (1983)	"TV Dinners" (1983)	"Legs" (1984)

"TV Dinners" is a song by American band ZZ Top from their 1983 album Eliminator. It was produced by band manager Bill Ham, and recorded and mixed by Terry Manning. The song is a simple, beat-driven and tongue-in-cheek tune with lyrics about pre-packaged, oven-ready meals, implying that these servings of industrially processed foods are standard cuisine for lonely and culinarily challenged unpartnered gentlemen. Promoted for radio play in the US, and released commercially as a single in the UK, it reached number 38 on the Billboard Top Rock Tracks chart.

== Recording ==
Guitarist Billy Gibbons once said he played a 1955 Gretsch Roundup while recording "TV Dinners". He also told Dean Zelinsky that he played a burgundy Dean ML throughout the recording of Eliminator. Longtime ZZ Top recording engineer Terry Manning told an online forum of professional sound engineers that Gibbons alternated between two Dean Guitars for the great majority of the album, including "98% of all guitar on this album, whether lead or rhythm".

== Music video ==
The "TV Dinners" video shows a young man alone in his high-tech live-work space during an electrical storm, heating a TV dinner within which forms a goblin. The retro sci-fi look is a departure from the previous Eliminator videos. In keeping with the retro sci-fi theme, several old sci-fi movie posters are visible, including U.F.O. and Frankenstein Meets the Space Monster.

Director Marius Penczner and his crew used stop-motion clay animation to show the goblin's claw emerging to change channels on a TV remote, repeatedly returning the multiple TV screens to display scenes of ZZ Top performing the song. Later, the goblin (it strongly resembles the monster from 1958's It! The Terror from Beyond Space) rises from the foil-wrapped package to steal potato chips while the nerdy bachelor is distracted playing a ZZ Top–themed driving game. "TV Dinners" was released in December 1983, with critics observing that the video was better than the song.

== Credits and personnel ==
- Billy Gibbons – guitar, vocals
- Dusty Hill – keyboards
- Frank Beard – drums
- Linden Hudson – preproduction engineer
- Terry Manning – engineer

== Charts ==
Chart (1983–1984)	Peak position
UK Singles Chart	67
U.S. Billboard Top Tracks	38
