= Afterburner (ZZ Top album) =

Studio album by ZZ Top
- Released: October 28, 1985
- Recorded: March–July 1985
- Genres: Pop; synth-rock; hard rock; blues rock
- Length: 37:02
- Label: Warner Bros.
- Producer: Bill Ham

ZZ Top chronology
Eliminator (1983)	Afterburner (1985)	The Six Pack (1987)

Singles from Afterburner
- 1. "Sleeping Bag" Released: October 1985; 2. "Stages" Released: December 1985; 3. "Rough Boy" Released: March 1986; 4. "Velcro Fly" Released: July 1986; 5. "Planet of Women" Released: January 1987

Afterburner is the ninth studio album by the American rock band ZZ Top, released in 1985. Although critics' response to the album was lukewarm, Afterburner was a commercial success, eventually going platinum five times and launching one hit single: "Sleeping Bag" which peaked at number one on the Mainstream Rock Tracks and at number eight on the Billboard Hot 100, equaling the peak of their previous single "Legs". The album yielded three other Top 40 singles in the United States: "Stages" (No. 21), "Rough Boy" (No. 22), and "Velcro Fly" (No. 35). "Can't Stop Rockin'" was used as the opening theme for the 1993 film Teenage Mutant Ninja Turtles III.

In the UK, it was the band's second album to be certified by the British Phonographic Industry, attaining Gold (100,000 units) in 1985. In 1990, it was certified Platinum (300,000 units).

== Recording ==
The album contains songs with sequenced keyboard beds. It was the first ZZ Top record since Rio Grande Mud without involvement from longtime engineer Terry Manning. Manning was willing to work on the album but was unavailable because of other commitments, and the band utilized some material, including part of "Can't Stop Rockin'", that was leftover from the sessions of the band's previous album, Eliminator.

== Reception ==
Professional ratings
Review scores
Source	Rating
AllMusic	3/5 stars
The Encyclopedia of Popular Music	4/5 stars
Kerrang!	4/5 stars
Q	3/5 stars
The Rolling Stone Album Guide	3/5 stars
The Village Voice	B

Stephen Thomas Erlewine of AllMusic stated in a retrospective review: "Well, if you just had your biggest hit ever, you'd probably try to replicate it, too. And if you were praised for being visionary because you played all your blues grooves to a slightly sequenced beat, you'd probably be tempted to not just continue in that direction, but to tighten the sequencer and graft on synthesizers, since it'll all signal how futuristic you are. [...] Problem is, no matter how much you dress ZZ Top up, they're still ZZ Top. Sometimes they can trick you into thinking they're a little flashier than usual, but they're still a lil' ol' blues band from Texas, kicking out blues-rockers. And blues-rock just doesn't kick when it's synthesized. [...] All this means that Afterburner is merely a product of its time -- the only record ZZ Top could have made at the time, but it hardly exists out of that time." Rolling Stone said "Afterburner may simply represent a transitional phase in this gifted eccentric's development as well as a tricky period in ZZ Top's continuing evolution from bell-bottom-blues band to sharp-dressed pop machine."

Robert Christgau gave a B score, stating: "With sales on Eliminator over five mil almost by accident, this hard-boogieing market strategy is defined by conscious commercial ambition--by its all but announced intention of making ZZ the next Bruce/Madonna/Prince/Michael, with two beards and a Beard at every checkout counter." Christgau cited "Rough Boy" and "Velcro Fly" as the highlights of the album.

The album was the band's first to hit number one, topping the charts in New Zealand. It peaked at number four on the Billboard 200, at number two on the UK Albums Chart, and at number six on the Australian albums chart.

== Track listing ==
All tracks are written by Billy Gibbons, Dusty Hill, and Frank Beard.

Side one
No.	Title	Length
1.	"Sleeping Bag"	4:02
2.	"Stages"	3:32
3.	"Woke Up with Wood"	3:45
4.	"Rough Boy"	4:50
5.	"Can't Stop Rockin'"	3:01

Side two
No.	Title	Length
6.	"Planet of Women"	4:04
7.	"I Got the Message"	3:27
8.	"Velcro Fly"	3:29
9.	"Dipping Low (In the Lap of Luxury)"	3:11
10.	"Delirious"	3:41

== Personnel ==
- Billy Gibbons – guitars, lead and backing vocals
- Dusty Hill – bass, backing vocals, lead vocals on "Can't Stop Rockin'" and "Delirious", keyboards
- Frank Beard – drums

=== Production ===
- Bill Ham – production
- Joe Hardy – engineering
- Bob Ludwig – engineering
- Jeri McManus – art direction, design
- Barry E. Jackson – artwork

== Charts ==
=== Weekly charts ===
Chart (1985–1987)	Peak position
Australian Albums (Kent Music Report)	6
Austrian Albums (Ö3 Austria)	18
Canada Top Albums/CDs (RPM)	1
Dutch Albums (Album Top 100)	23
European Albums (Eurotipsheet)	5
Finnish Albums (The Official Finnish Charts)	1
German Albums (Offizielle Top 100)	3
New Zealand Albums (RMNZ)	1
Norwegian Albums (VG-lista)	8
Swedish Albums (Sverigetopplistan)	3
Swiss Albums (Schweizer Hitparade)	2
UK Albums (Official Charts)	2
US Billboard 200	4

=== Year-end charts ===
Chart (1985)	Position
New Zealand Albums (RMNZ)	31

Chart (1986)	Position
German Albums (Offizielle Top 100)	24
New Zealand Albums (RMNZ)	31

== Certifications ==
Region	Certification	Certified units/sales
Australia (ARIA)	2× Platinum	140,000^{^}
Canada (Music Canada)	3× Platinum	300,000^{^}
Finland (Musiikkituottajat)	Platinum	62,795
France (SNEP)	Gold	100,000^{*}
Germany (BVMI)	3× Gold	750,000^{^}
Japan (RIAJ)	Gold	100,000^{^}
New Zealand (RMNZ)	Platinum	15,000^{^}
Norway (IFPI Norway)	Silver	25,000
Sweden (GLF)	Platinum	100,000^{^}
Switzerland (IFPI Switzerland)	Platinum	50,000^{^}
United Kingdom (BPI)	Platinum	300,000^{^}
United States (RIAA)	5× Platinum	5,000,000^{^}
^{*} Sales figures based on certification alone.^{^} Shipments figures based on certification alone.
