= Stages (song) =

Single by ZZ Top

from the album Afterburner
- Released: 1986
- Recorded: 1985
- Genre: Hard rock
- Length: 3:32
- Label: Warner Bros.
- Songwriters: Billy Gibbons, Dusty Hill, Frank Beard
- Producer: Bill Ham

ZZ Top singles chronology
"Sleeping Bag" (1985)	"Stages" (1986)	"Woke Up with Wood" (1986)

"Stages" is a song by American rock band ZZ Top. It was released as the second single from their ninth studio album Afterburner (1985). It peaked at number 21 on the United States Billboard Hot 100 and topped the Billboard Hot Mainstream Rock Tracks chart for two weeks.

== Release and reception ==
During the week of December 6, 1985, Radio & Records said that 62 percent of album oriented rock radio stations reporting to the publication had included "Stages" in their playlists. By January 1986, the song was amongst the most added songs to contemporary hit radio, with Billboard reporting that the song had received 100 adds during the week ending January 18, 1986. That same month, a music video was serviced to MTV, where it received power rotation.

Upon its release as a single, Cashbox called "Stages" "melodic, driving, and danceable." Billboard characterized it as "rollicking" and "high-powered" with "thick keyboard backing". In a retrospective review, Stephen Thomas Erlewine of AllMusic said that the song was a "terrific post-new wave rocker" that was the poppiest thing they ever cut".

== Formats and track listings ==
- 7-inch single (United States)
1. "Stages" – 3:32
2. "Can't Stop Rockin'" – 3:01
- 12-inch single (United States)
1. "Stages" (extended version) – 5:05
2. "Stages" – 3:32
3. "Hi Fi Mama" – 2:22

== Charts ==
Chart (1986)	Peak position
Australia (Kent Music Report)	63
Canada (RPM)	42
Ireland (IRMA)	23
New Zealand (Recorded Music NZ)	40
UK Singles (Official Charts)	43
US Billboard Hot 100	21
US Hot Mainstream Rock Tracks (Billboard)	1
