= Quail Valley (Missouri City, Texas) =

Master-Planned Community in Missouri City, Texas

- Community
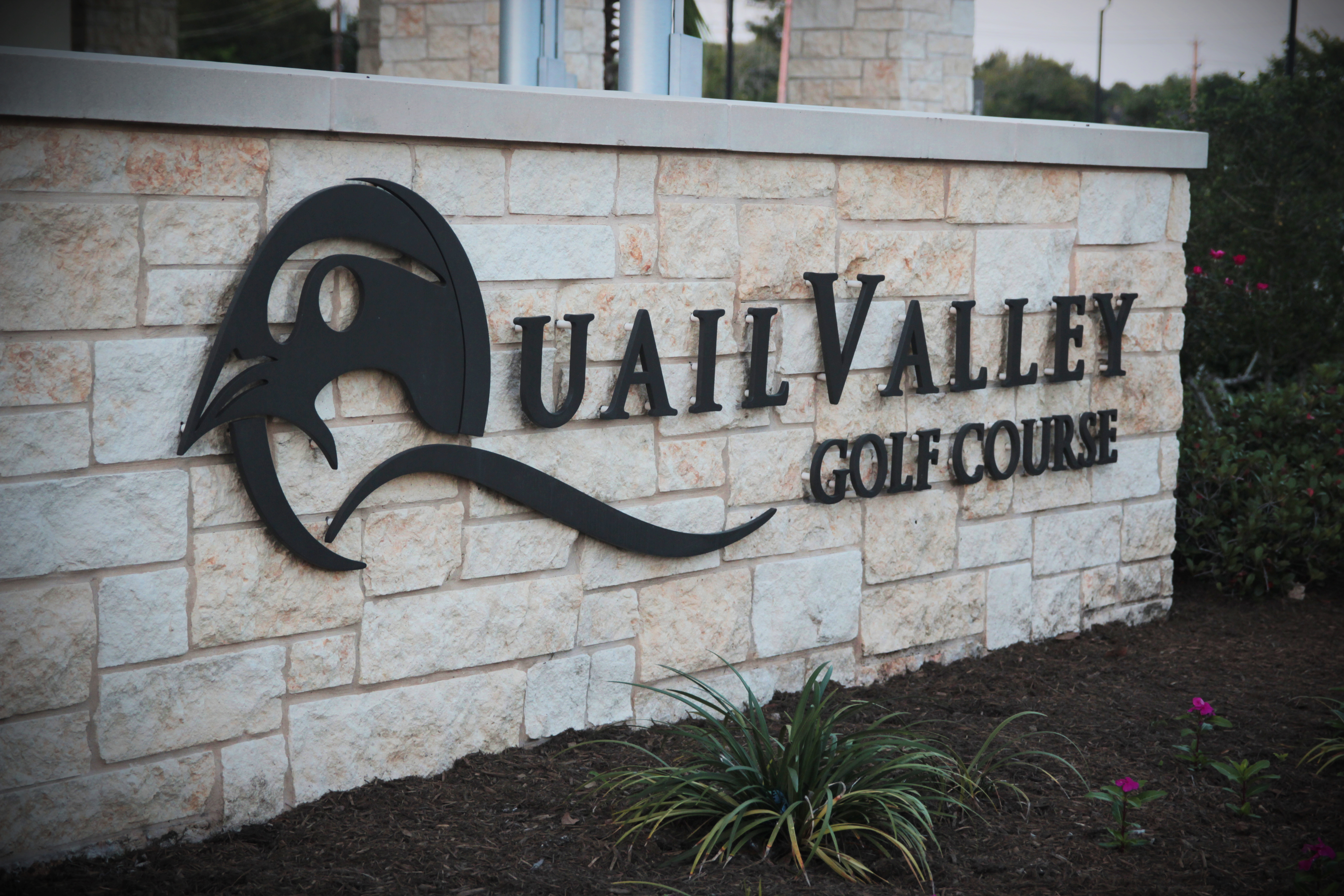
- Quail Valley Golf Course

- Interactive map of Quail Valley
- Country: United States
- State: Texas
- County: Fort Bend County
- City: Missouri City, Texas
- Construction started: 1969
- Founded by: James H. "Mac" MacNaughton
- Named after: Predominance of Quail in the area at the time of founding
- ZIP Code: 77459

Location of Quail Valley

Quail Valley is a neighborhood dating from 1969 of Missouri City (a southwest suburb of Houston), in Fort Bend County, Texas, United States.

The homeowners association is the Quail Valley Fund.

== History ==
The community was developed beginning in 1969 by James H. "Mac" MacNaughton. A friend suggested that he travel to the area to do land scouting, and MacNaughton decided to buy what became Quail Valley because he believed from its appearance that it could be developed into a country-club community. He named it Quail Valley because a lot of quail were in the area at the time. He initially bought 600 acres (240 ha) of space and began living in Quail Valley when it first opened. A golf course was added and additional land was acquired. Development of houses generally ended at the end of the 1970s although a few new homes were built in the following decades.

In the 1970s the community hosted several golf tournaments conducted by the Houston Open.

In 1985 MacNaughton gave up control over the community country club and sold his Quail Valley lands.

In 2008 MacNaughton died. The former Executive Nine golf course, acquired by the city government and turned into a public park, was renamed MacNaughton Park.

== Geography ==
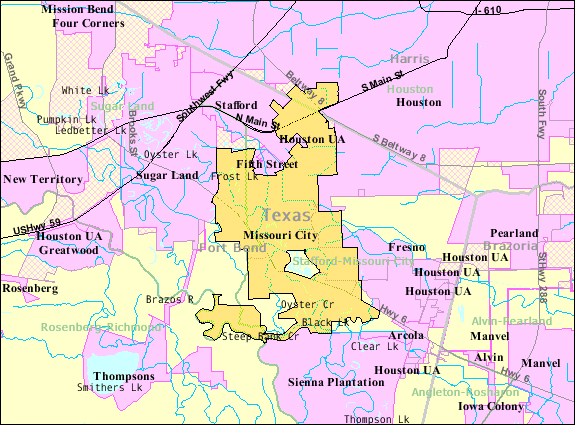
Map of Missouri City

Quail Valley is located at 29°34′19″N 95°32′44″W (29.571964, -95.545521), in the central part of Missouri City, Texas.

As of 2007 the original portion of Quail Valley has over 3,000 houses, and the community has more than 15 subdivisions. The Quail Valley area, including the original subdivision and other surrounding communities with the Quail Valley name, had 4,372 houses.

Various kinds of wildlife are present in the area. Historically there were many quails, and alligators and herons populating Quail Valley's lakes.

The approximate boundaries are Cartwright Road, Glenn Lakes Lane, Murphy Road, and Texas Parkway. The boundaries and surrounding neighborhoods are generally accepted to be as shown in these locators:

Surrounding neighborhoods:

Note: This Neighborhood Locator is for general reference purposes only and is not inclusive of every adjoining subdivision.

== Demographics ==
At the 2000 census, there were 11,938 people and 4,282 households in Census Tract 6710 (which is essentially all of the described area except for homes south of and on the south side of Glenn Lakes Ln). The population density was 3,574.3 inhabitants per square mile (1,380.0/km^{2}). The racial makeup of the community was 64.23% White, 20.91% African American, 0.24% Native American, 4.03% Asian, 0.04% Pacific Islander, 0.12% from other races, and 1.56% from two or more races. Hispanic or Latino of any race were 8.87% of the population. For every 100 females, there were 96.8 males.

A study commissioned by the Quail Valley Fund in October 2005; conducted by Richard Murray, a sociologist at the University of Houston; and published in 2006 by Southwest Business Research; stated that persons under the age of 18 resided in 76% of the houses in Quail Valley, and that the population overall was "relatively stable but aging". That year Jerry Wyatt, a member of the Missouri City city council, stated that there were more younger new residents in Quail Valley.

== Homeowners' associations ==
- Quail Valley proper: Quail Valley Fund: The largest homeowners association in the community, serving 3047 properties.

Homeowner's associations covering adjacent subdivisions with the Quail Valley name:

- Quail Valley East Community Association: Contains 1049 properties.
- Quail Valley Thunderbird North HOA: Contains 581 properties.
- Quail Valley Thunderbird West:
- Quail Valley Patio Homes: Contains 114 properties.
- Quail Valley Townhomes:
- Quail Valley Townhouses I & II:
- Pebble Beach Patio Homes: Contains 39 properties.

== Civic organizations ==
There are several civic organizations in the subdivision, including Quail Valley Proud and the Quail Valley Garden Club.

== Education ==
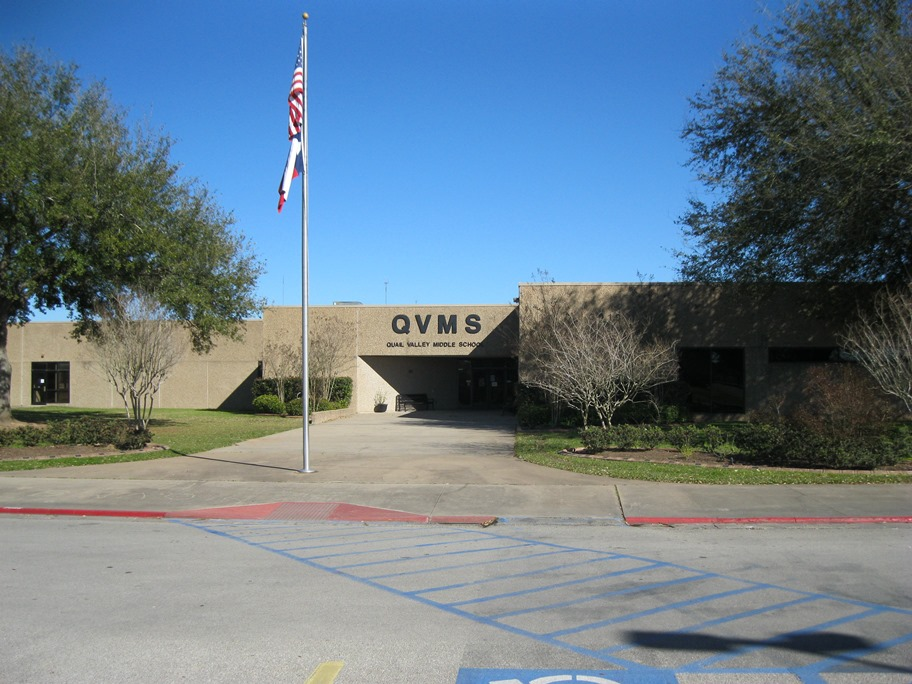
Quail Valley Middle School

Fort Bend Independent School District (FBISD) operates public schools serving Quail Valley. Portions of the development are served by Lantern Lane Elementary School and Quail Valley Elementary School. All residents are zoned to Quail Valley Middle School, and Elkins High School.

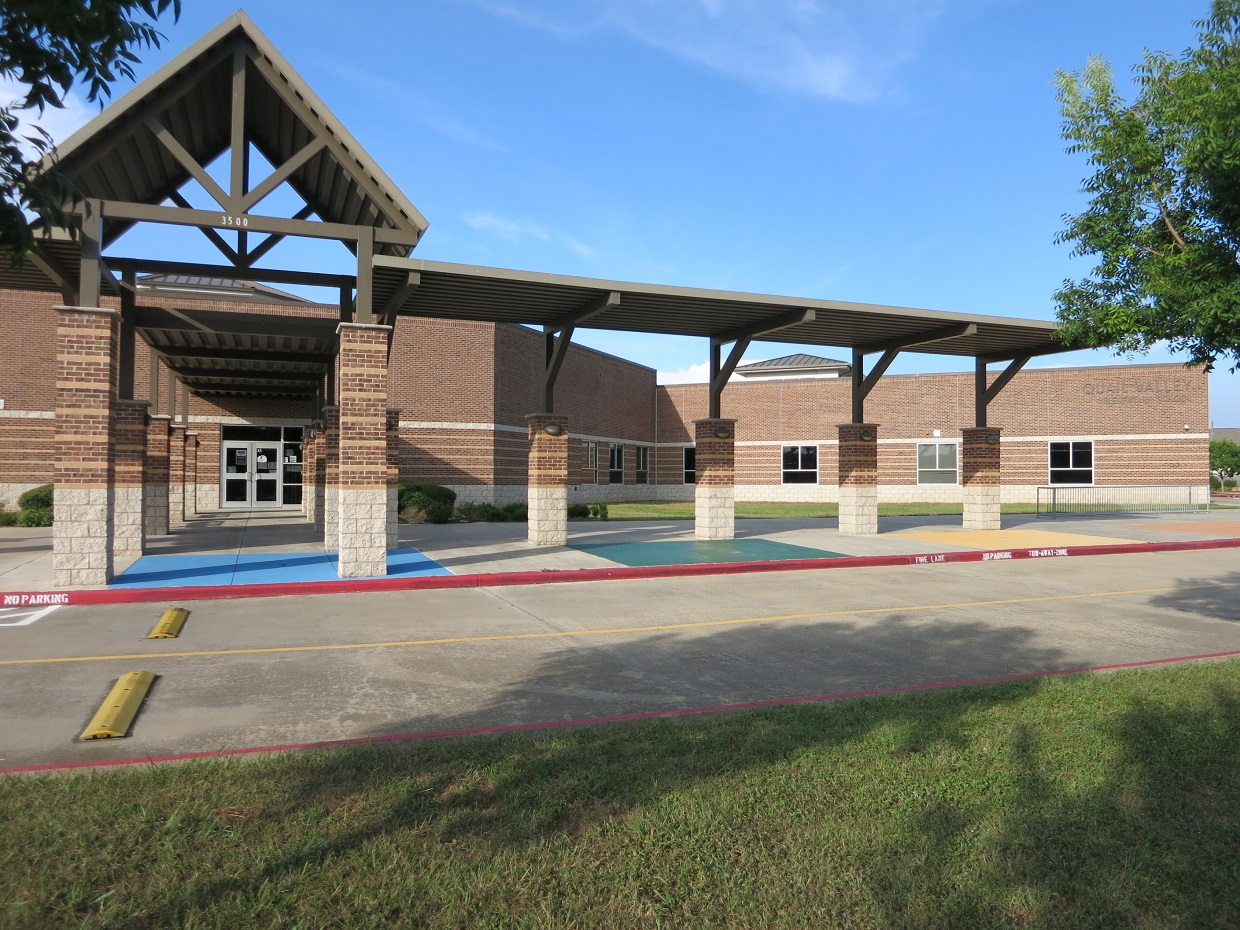
Quail Valley Elementary School

Quail Valley Elementary opened in August 1975. Quail Valley Junior High School, which became Quail Valley Middle, opened in September 1978. Lantern Lane Elementary opened in January 1979. Elkins High opened in August 1992. By 2007 FBISD established Quail Valley's gifted and talented program. Zen C. T. Zheng of the Houston Chronicle stated that this "also is seen as an attraction."

Area private schools include All Saints Episcopal School, International Preparatory School, Southminster School and Towne Creek School.

Missouri City residents are served by Houston Community College. The University of Houston Sugar Land Campus is also nearby.

Residents may use libraries operated by Fort Bend County Library.

== Parks and Recreation ==
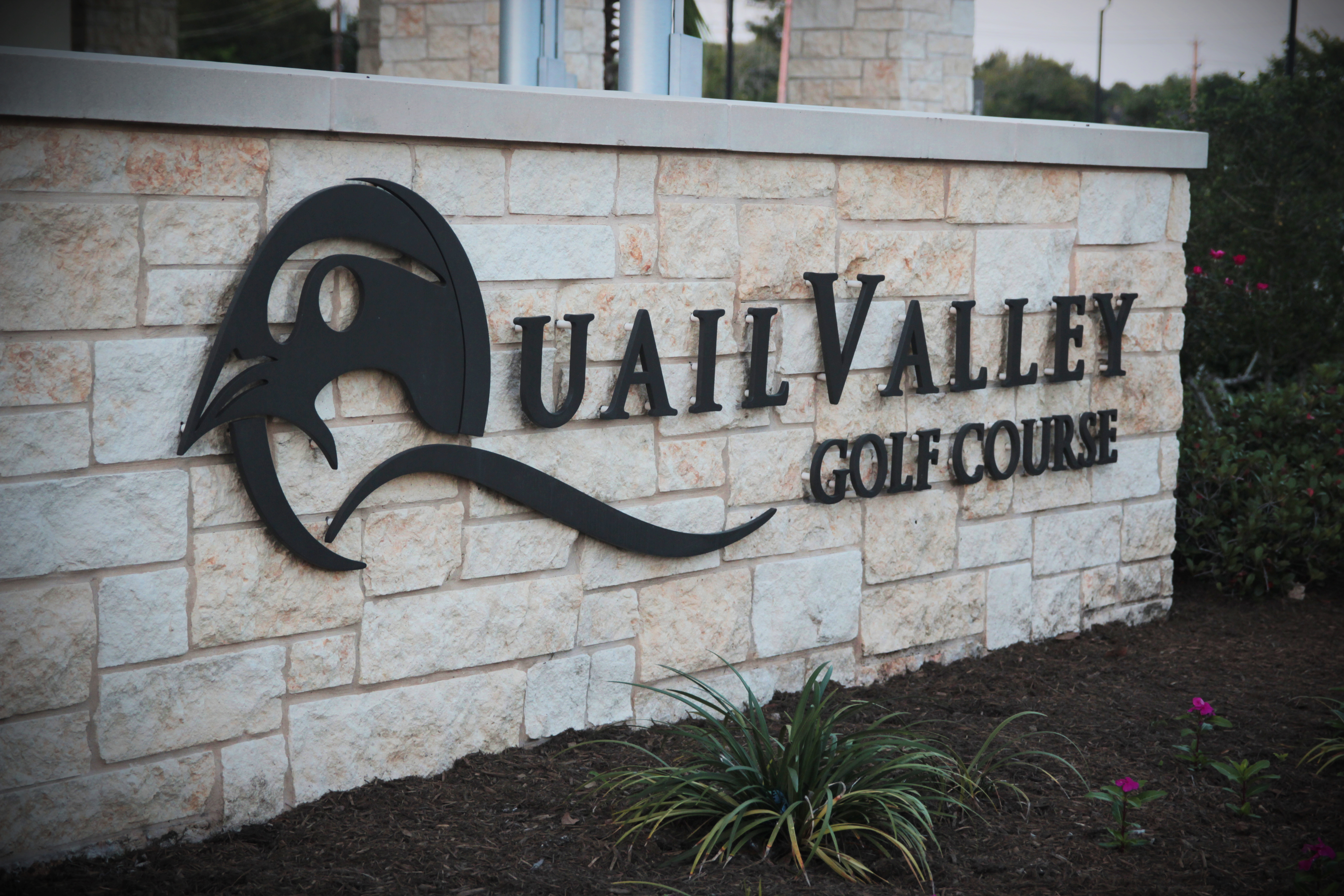
Quail Valley Golf Course

City-owned Quail Valley Golf Course offers two 18-hole courses: El Dorado, which reopened on November 27, 2009, after extensive upgrading, and La Quinta.

Historically Quail Valley was centered the Quail Valley Country Club, owned by Renaissance Golf Group LLC of Dublin, Ohio, which included a group of golf courses: a nine-hole executive course, a nine-hole par-3 course, and two championship golf courses with 18 holes each. The golf courses took up 400 acres (160 ha) of land. In 2007 Renaissance Golf Group indicated it was considering selling the golf courses. By then the country club property had fallen into a state of disrepair. Area residents had concerns over how the sale would affect their property values. The Quail Valley Fund initially had plans to buy the property, but the City of Missouri City government indicated it wished to purchase the golf courses, and on April 2, 2007, a consultant received money from city officials to do a feasibility study over converting the properties into a municipal park.

The city government began the eminent domain process to acquire the country club property on March 3, 2008. The city government paid $3.1 million to the owners on June 27, 2008; the value was determined to be that amount during a hearing on June 24 of that year. The Quail Valley Golf Course, now owned by the city government, opened in July of that year. In November 2008 the city government held a bond referendum for $17.5 million to improve the property, and citizens voted in favor by 72%. By 2011 it had a positive financial operation.

The City Centre at Quail Valley was opened in December 2012. The clubhouse venue contains 25,000 square feet of space, and includes Bluebonnet Grille and multiple ballrooms, and offers event services.

Missouri City Recreation & Tennis Center, located on Cypress Point Drive in Quail Valley, opened in July 2012. The recreation center includes a weight and cardio fitness room, tennis courts, batting cages, a full-size gymnasium, and three multi-purpose rooms, with recreation and fitness programs to offer residents and the public. The Recreation & Tennis Center has 24,488 square feet (2,275.0 m^{2}) of space.

Quail Valley has a swimming pool and a tennis court.
