= ZZ Top discography =

Cataloging of published recordings by ZZ Top

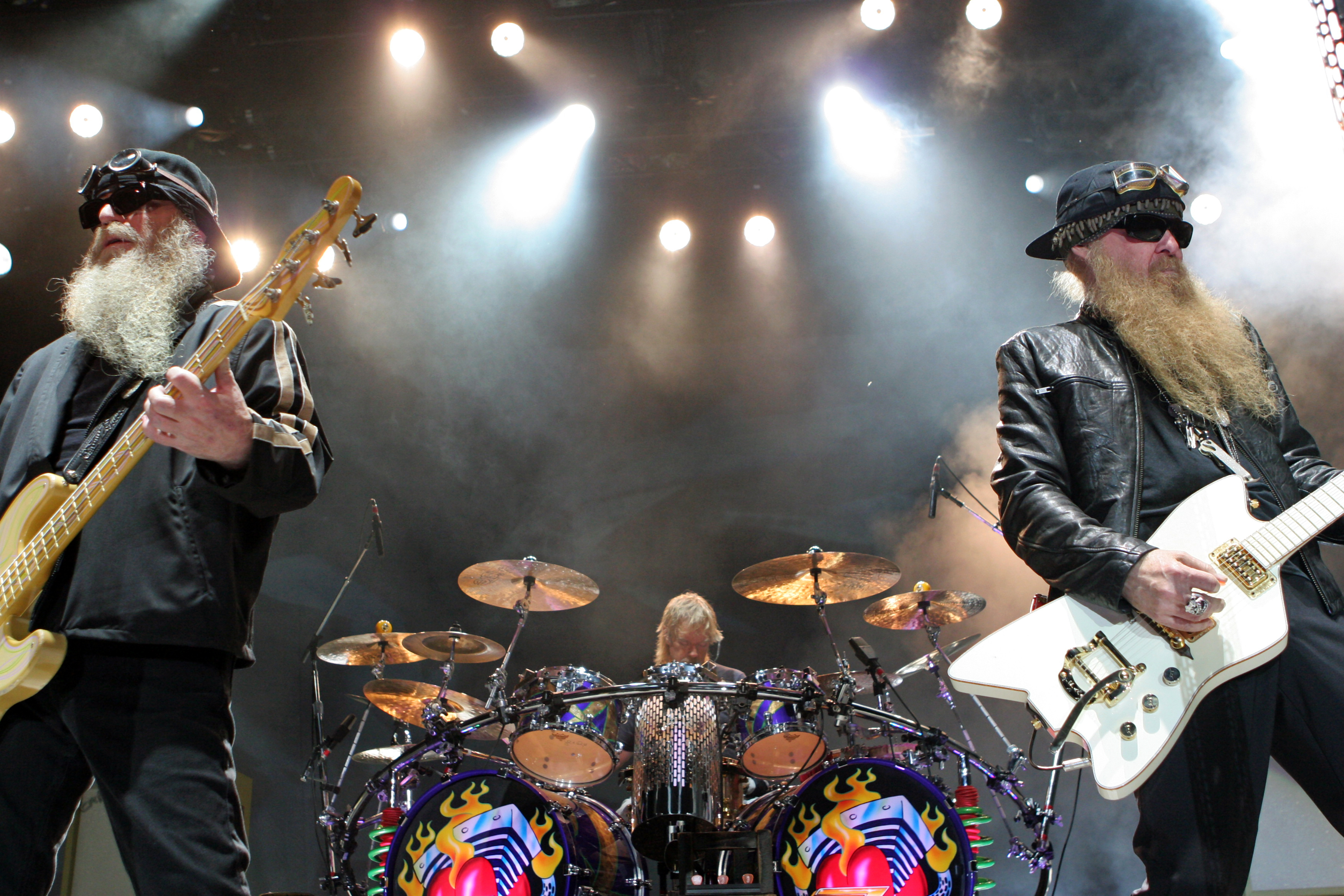
- ZZ Top in 2008. From left to right: Dusty Hill, Frank Beard and Billy Gibbons.
- Studio albums: 15
- Extended plays: 3
- Live albums: 4
- Compilation albums: 6
- Singles: 38
- Video albums: 4

The following is a comprehensive discography of ZZ Top, an American rock band. They have released 15 studio albums, four live albums, six compilation albums and 38 singles.

== Albums ==
=== Studio albums ===
Year	Album details	Peak chart positions										Certifications (sales threshold)
Year	Album details	US	AUS	AUT	CAN	FRA	GER	NOR	SWE	SWI	UK	Certifications (sales threshold)
1971	ZZ Top's First Album: Release date: January 16, 1971; Label: London Records	— (Note: ZZ Top's First Album did not enter the Billboard 200, but peaked at #201 on the Bubbling Under the Top LP's chart.)	—	—	—	—	—	—	—	—	—	
1972	Rio Grande Mud: Release date: April 4, 1972; Label: London Records	104	90	—	—	—	—	—	—	—	—	
1973	Tres Hombres: Release date: July 26, 1973; Label: London Records	8	36	—	13	—	—	—	—	—	—	US: Gold; CAN: Gold
1975	Fandango!: Release date: April 18, 1975; Label: London Records	10	61	—	1	—	—	—	—	—	60	US: Gold; CAN: Platinum
1976	Tejas: Release date: November 29, 1976; Label: London Records	17	72	—	3	—	—	—	21	—	—	US: Gold
1979	Degüello: Release date: November 8, 1979; Label: Warner Bros. Records	24	100	19	5	—	—	—	—	—	—	US: Platinum; GER: Gold
1981	El Loco: Release date: July 15, 1981; Label: Warner Bros. Records	17	—	—	19	—	52	—	26	—	88	US: Gold
1983	Eliminator: Release date: March 23, 1983; Label: Warner Bros. Records	9	2	—	2	—	25	13	13	11	3	US: Diamond; AUT: Gold; CAN: Diamond; AUS: 4× Platinum; FIN: Platinum; GER: 3× Gold; FRA: 2× Platinum; UK: 4× Platinum
1985	Afterburner: Release date: October 28, 1985; Label: Warner Bros. Records	4	6	18	1	—	3	8	3	2	2	US: 5× Platinum; AUS: 2× Platinum; GER: 3× Gold; FIN: Platinum; FRA: Gold; UK: Platinum
1990	Recycler: Release date: October 16, 1990; Label: Warner Bros. Records	6	27	15	10	—	4	2	2	1	8	US: Platinum; CAN: Platinum; FIN: Platinum; GER: Platinum; SWI: Platinum; UK: Silver; FRA: 2× Gold
1994	Antenna: Release date: January 18, 1994; Label: RCA Records	14	40	2	8	—	3	4	1	3	3	US: Platinum; AUT: Gold; CAN: Gold; FIN: Gold; FRA: Gold; GER: Gold; NOR: Gold; SWI: Gold
1996	Rhythmeen: Release date: September 17, 1996; Label: RCA Records	29	146	31	38	14	9	15	6	8	32	
1999	XXX: Release date: September 28, 1999; Label: RCA Records	100	176	—	—	50	11	—	26	23	—	
2003	Mescalero: Release date: September 9, 2003; Label: RCA Records	57	—	33	—	46	9	21	22	22	—	
2012	La Futura: Release date: September 11, 2012; Label: American Recordings	6	75	7	7	13	5	7	11	4	29	GER: Gold
"—" denotes releases that did not chart

=== Live albums ===
Year	Album details	Peak chart positions									Certifications (sales threshold)
Year	Album details	US	AUT	BEL	FIN	FRA	GER	NLD	SWI	UK	Certifications (sales threshold)
2008	Live from Texas: Released: October 28, 2008; Label: Eagle Rock	—	—	—	—	145	—	—	—	—	
2011	Live in Germany 1980: Released: 2011; Label: Eagle Rock	—	—	—	—	—	—	—	—	—	
2016	Tonite at Midnight: Live Greatest Hits from Around the World: Released: September 9, 2016; Label: Suretone	111	50	108	—	89	35	139	30	50	
2022	Raw ('That Little Ol' Band from Texas' Original Soundtrack): Released: July 22, 2022; Label: BMG Rights Management	141	19	85	37	102	3	—	5	81	
"—" denotes releases that did not chart

=== Compilation albums ===
Year	Album details	Peak chart positions										Certifications (sales threshold)
Year	Album details	US	AUS	AUT	FRA	GER	NLD	NOR	SWE	SWI	UK	Certifications (sales threshold)
1977	The Best of ZZ Top: Released: March 21, 1977; Label: London Records	94	44	—	—	—	—	—	—	—	—	US: 2× Platinum
1992	Greatest Hits: Released: April 14, 1992; Label: Warner Bros. Records	9	2	2	—	4	7	7	2	1	5	US: 3× Platinum; AUS: 4× Platinum; AUT: Platinum; BEL: Platinum; CAN: Platinum; FIN: Platinum; FRA: Diamond; GER: 3× Gold; SWI: Platinum; UK: Platinum
1994	One Foot in the Blues: Released: November 22, 1994; Label: Warner Bros. Records	—	142	—	—	47	—	—	25	28	—	
2004	Rancho Texicano: The Very Best of ZZ Top: Released: June 8, 2004; Label: Rhino Entertainment	30	—	—	178	—	—	—	—	—	—	UK: Silver
2014	The Very Baddest: Released: July 22, 2014; Label: Warner Brothers	95	—	—	200	—	82	—	—	48	—	UK: Gold
2019	Goin' 50: Released: June 14, 2019; Label: Warner Records Inc.	129	—	—	—	28	—	—	—	22	—	
"—" denotes releases that did not chart

=== Video albums ===
Year	Album details	Peak chart positions		Certifications (sales threshold)
Year	Album details	GER	SWI	Certifications (sales threshold)
1992	Greatest Hits: The Video Collection: Released: 1992; Label: Warner Music Vision	—	—	US: Platinum
2008	Live from Texas: Released: October 28, 2008; Label: Eagle Rock	21	2	US: 2× Multi-Platinum; CAN: 5× Multi-Platinum; GER: Platinum; AUS: Gold; FIN: Gold
2009	Double Down Live: 1980 & 2008: Released: October 20, 2009; Label: Eagle Rock	60	8	
2014	Live at Montreux 2013: Released: July 22, 2014; Label: Eagle Rock	35	3	
"—" denotes releases that did not chart

== Box sets ==
Year	Album details	Peak chart positions			
Year	Album details	AUS	FIN	GER	SWE
1987	The Six Pack: Released: 1987; Label: Warner Bros. Records	99	—	—	—
2003	Chrome, Smoke & BBQ: Released: October 14, 2003; Label: Warner Bros. Records	—	—	—	—
2013	The Complete Studio Albums 1970-1990: Released: June 7, 2013; Label: Rhino/Warner Records	—	40	88	38
2017	Cinco: The First Five LPs: Released: June 9, 2017; Label: Rhino/Warner Records	—	—	—	—
2018	Cinco №2: The Second Five LPs: Released: June 1, 2018; Label: Rhino/Warner Records	—	—	—	—
"—" denotes releases that did not chart

== EPs ==
Year	EP	Peak chart positions				
Year	EP	US	IRE	NOR	NZ	UK
1985	The ZZ Top Summer Holiday E.P.	—	23	—	24	51
1987	Club	—	—	—	6	—
2012	Texicali	106	—	35	—	—
"—" denotes releases that did not chart

== Singles ==
Year	Single	Peak chart positions											Certifications	Album
Year	Single	US Main	US	AUS	CAN	GER	IRE	NLD	NZ	SWE	SWI	UK	Certifications	Album
1969	"Salt Lick" b/w "Miller's Farm"	—	—	—	—	—	—	—	—	—	—	—		Non-album single
1970	"(Somebody Else Been) Shakin' Your Tree"	—	—	—	—	—	—	—	—	—	—	—		ZZ Top's First Album
1972	"Francine"	—	69	—	—	—	—	—	—	—	—	—		Rio Grande Mud
1974	"La Grange"	—	41	18	34	—	—	—	—	—	—	—	UK: Silver	Tres Hombres
1974	"Beer Drinkers & Hell Raisers"	—	—	—	—	—	—	—	—	—	—	—		Tres Hombres
1975	"Tush"	—	20	87	14	—	—	—	—	—	—	—		Fandango!
1976	"It's Only Love"	—	44	—	55	—	—	—	—	—	—	—		Tejas
1977	"Arrested for Driving While Blind"	—	91	—	86	—	—	—	—	—	—	—		Tejas
1977	"Enjoy and Get It On"	—	105	—	87	—	—	—	—	—	—	—		Tejas
1980	"I Thank You"	—	34	—	52	—	—	—	—	—	—	—		Degüello
1980	"Cheap Sunglasses"	—	89	—	—	—	—	—	—	—	—	—		Degüello
1981	"Leila"	—	77	—	—	—	—	—	—	—	—	—		El Loco
1981	"Tube Snake Boogie"	4	103	—	—	—	—	—	—	—	—	—		El Loco
1983	"Gimme All Your Lovin'"	2	37	82	39	—	9	3	—	—	—	10	UK: Gold	Eliminator
1983	"Sharp Dressed Man"	8	56	66	—	—	8	8	—	—	—	22	UK: Silver	Eliminator
1983	"TV Dinners"	38	—	—	—	—	—	—	—	—	—	67		Eliminator
1984	"Legs"	3	8	6	9	—	9	19	7	—	—	16		Eliminator
1985	"Sleeping Bag"	1	8	36	18	40	14	—	13	13	—	27		Afterburner
1985	"Stages"	1	21	63	42	—	23	—	40	—	—	43		Afterburner
1986	"Rough Boy"	5	22	85	58	—	23	—	—	—	—	23		Afterburner
1986	"Velcro Fly"	15	35	—	—	68	—	—	10	—	—	54		Afterburner
1987	"Planet of Women"	—	—	—	—	—	—	—	—	—	—	—		Afterburner
1990	"Doubleback"	1	50	41	14	33	—	—	28	9	13	29		Recycler
1990	"Concrete and Steel"	1	—	—	35	—	—	—	—	—	—	—		Recycler
1990	"My Head's in Mississippi"	1	—	166	79	—	—	—	—	—	—	37		Recycler
1990	"Give It Up"	2	79	106	33	69	—	—	—	—	—	—		Recycler
1991	"Burger Man"	—	—	—	—	—	—	—	—	—	—	—		Recycler
1992	"Viva Las Vegas"	16	—	28	34	34	8	27	17	7	20	10		Greatest Hits
1992	"Rough Boy" (1992 re-release)	—	—	165	—	—	—	81	—	—	38	49		Greatest Hits
1994	"Pincushion"	1	124	122	32	—	—	—	33	11	40	15		Antenna
1994	"Breakaway"	7	—	166	42	—	—	—	—	—	—	60		Antenna
1994	"PCH"	—	—	—	—	—	—	—	—	—	—	—		Antenna
1994	"Fuzzbox Voodoo"	30	—	—	—	—	—	—	—	—	—	—		Antenna
1996	"She's Just Killing Me"	12	—	—	34	—	—	—	—	—	—	—		Rhythmeen
1996	"What's Up with That"	5	—	196	7	—	—	—	—	—	—	58		Rhythmeen
1996	"Bang Bang"	22	—	—	35	—	—	—	—	—	—	—		Rhythmeen
1999	"Fearless Boogie"	13	—	—	—	—	—	—	—	—	—	—		XXX
2000	"36-22-36"	31	—	—	—	—	—	—	—	—	—	—		XXX
2003	"Piece"	—	—	—	—	—	—	—	—	—	—	—		Mescalero
2012	"I Gotsta Get Paid"	—	—	—	—	—	—	—	—	—	—	—		La Futura
"—" denotes releases that did not chart, "x" denotes when chart did not exist

=== As featured artist ===
Year	Single	Peak chart positions				Album
Year	Single	GER	BEL	SWI	UK	Album
1999	"Gimme All Your Lovin' 2000" (Martay feat. ZZ Top)	39	56	33	28	Non-album single
"—" denotes releases that did not chart

=== Promo singles ===
Year	Single	Peak chart positions	Album
Year	Single	US Main	Album
1985	"Can't Stop Rockin'"	8	Afterburner
1986	"Delirious"	16	Afterburner
1986	"Woke Up with Wood"	18	Afterburner
1990	"Decision or Collison"	14	Recycler
1994	"Girl in a T-Shirt"	27	Antenna
1997	"Rhythmeen"	35	Rhythmeen
1997	"Loaded"	-	Rhythmeen
2000	"Poke Chop Sandwich"	-	XXX
"—" denotes releases that did not chart

=== Other charted songs ===
Year	Single	Peak chart positions	Album
Year	Single	US Main	Album
1981	"Pearl Necklace"	28	El Loco
1983	"Got Me Under Pressure"	18	Eliminator
1992	"Gun Love"	8	Greatest Hits
"—" denotes releases that did not chart

== Other appearances ==
Year	Song	Album	Artist	Notes
1990	"Reverberation (Doubt)"	Where the Pyramid Meets the Eye: A Tribute to Roky Erickson	Various artists	The 13th Floor Elevators cover
2003	"She Loves My Automobile" (Willie Nelson with ZZ Top)	Live and Kickin'	Willie Nelson & Friends	Live recording
2016	"Waiting for the Bus" / "Jesus Just Left Chicago"	Crossroads Revisited: Selections from the Crossroads Guitar Festivals	Eric Clapton and Guests	Live recordings
