= Recycler Tour =

1990–91 concert tour by ZZ Top

- Tour by ZZ Top
- Location: North America; Europe
- Associated album: Recycler
- Start date: October 2, 1990
- End date: September 27, 1991
- Legs: 4
- No. of shows: 160

ZZ Top concert chronology
- Afterburner World Tour (1985–87); Recycler Tour (1990–91); Antenna World Tour (1994)

The Recycler Tour was a concert tour by American rock band ZZ Top. Presented by Beaver Productions and sponsored by Miller Lite, the tour took place in North America and Europe. The set list featured material from the band's previous seven studio albums. Venues were mostly arenas.

== Itinerary ==
The tour coincided with the October 1990 release of the band's album Recycler. The tour began on October 2, 1990 in Vancouver, British Columbia and ended on September 27, 1991 in Mexico City.

Bryan Adams, The Law, Thunder, and Little Angels were the opening acts for the show on July 6, 1991.

== Opening acts ==
- The Law
- Thunder
- Little Angels
- Black Crowes
- Extreme

== Set list ==
=== Opening ===
John Farnham

=== Bryan Adams ===
1. "She's Only Happy When She's Dancing"
2. "Kids Wanna Rock"
3. "Hey Honey – I'm Packin' You In!"
4. "It's Only Love"
5. "Can't Stop This Thing We Started"
6. "Cuts Like a Knife"
7. "Take Me Back"
8. "Thought I'd Died and Gone to Heaven"
9. "When the Night Comes"
10. "Heat of the Night"
11. "Heaven"
12. "(Everything I Do) I Do It for You"
13. "Run to You"
14. "Somebody"
15. "There Will Never Be Another Tonight"
16. "Long Gone"
17. "Summer of '69"
18. "One Night Love Affair"
19. "C'mon Everybody"

=== ZZ Top ===
1. "Planet of Women"
2. "Sleeping Bag"
3. "Tell It"
4. "Beer Drinkers & Hell Raisers"
5. "Waitin' for the Bus"
6. "Jesus Just Left Chicago"
7. "I'm Bad, I'm Nationwide"
8. "Ten Foot Pole"
9. "Burger Man"
10. "Gimme All Your Lovin'"
11. "Concrete and Steel"
12. "My Head's in Mississippi"
13. "Manic Mechanic"
14. "Heard It on the X"
15. "Cheap Sunglasses"
16. "2000 Blues"
17. "Blue Jean Blues"
18. "Just Got Paid"
19. "Doubleback"
20. "Got Me Under Pressure"
21. "Sharp Dressed Man"
22. "Give It Up"
23. "Legs"
24. "Tube Snake Boogie"
25. "La Grange"
26. "Tush"

== Tour dates ==
List of concerts, showing date, city, country, venue, tickets sold, number of available tickets and amount of gross revenue
| Date | City | Country | Venue | Opening act(s) | Attendance | Revenue |
Leg 1: arenas in North America
| October 2, 1990 | Vancouver | Canada | Pacific Coliseum | Colin James | 13,500 / 13,500 | $301,827 |
| October 4, 1990 | Edmonton | Canada | Northlands Coliseum | Colin James | 10,938 / 10,938 | $226,743 |
| October 5, 1990 | Calgary | Canada | Olympic Saddledome | Colin James | 11,338 / 11,338 | $239,594 |
| October 6, 1990 | Saskatoon | Canada | Saskatchewan Place | Colin James | 8,558 / 8,558 | $189,454 |
| October 7, 1990 | Winnipeg | Canada | Winnipeg Arena | Colin James | 8,505 / 8,505 | $194,615 |
| October 11, 1990 | Toronto | Canada | Maple Leaf Gardens | Colin James | 13,534 / 13,534 | $294,697 |
| October 13, 1990 | Montreal | Canada | Montreal Forum | Colin James | 13,900 / 13,900 | $268,307 |
| October 20, 1990 | Dallas | United States | Cotton Bowl | Steve Miller Band, Santana | 74,100 / 74,100 | $1,715,688 |
| October 25, 1990 | Wichita | United States | Britt Brown Arena | Colin James | 11,875 / 11,875 | $224,837 |
| October 26, 1990 | Omaha | United States | Omaha Civic Auditorium | Colin James | 10,200 / 10,200 | $229,203 |
| October 28, 1990 | Ames | United States | Hilton Coliseum | Colin James | 10,350 / 10,350 | $191,139 |
| October 29, 1990 | Cedar Rapids | United States | Five Seasons Center | Colin James | 10,000 / 10,000 | $183,300 |
| October 31, 1990 | Milwaukee | United States | Bradley Center | Colin James | 12,140 / 12,140 | $226,420 |
| November 1, 1990 | Peoria | United States | Peoria Civic Center Arena | Colin James | 9,908 / 9,908 | $185,309 |
| November 3, 1990 | Minneapolis | United States | Target Center | Johnny Van Zant | 15,469 / 15,469 | $313,278 |
| November 4, 1990 | Madison | United States | Dane County Coliseum | Johnny Van Zant | — | — |
| November 6, 1990 | Notre Dame | United States | Joyce Center | Johnny Van Zant | 9,094 / 9,094 | $168,363 |
| November 7, 1990 | St. Louis | United States | St. Louis Arena | Johnny Van Zant | 23,710 / 23,710 | $450,300 |
| November 8, 1990 | St. Louis | United States | St. Louis Arena | Johnny Van Zant | 23,710 / 23,710 | $450,300 |
| November 11, 1990 | Denver | United States | McNichols Sports Arena | Johnny Van Zant | 18,515 / 24,700 | $392,097 |
| November 12, 1990 | Denver | United States | McNichols Sports Arena | Johnny Van Zant | 18,515 / 24,700 | $392,097 |
| November 14, 1990 | Billings | United States | Yellowstone METRA | Johnny Van Zant | — | — |
| November 16, 1990 | Pullman | United States | Beasley Coliseum | Jeff Healey Band | — | — |
| November 18, 1990 | Tacoma | United States | Tacoma Dome | Jeff Healey Band | 24,006 / 24,006 | $466,840 |
| November 19, 1990 | Portland | United States | Portland Memorial Coliseum | Jeff Healey Band | 20,264 / 20,264 | $395,117 |
| November 20, 1990 | Portland | United States | Portland Memorial Coliseum | Jeff Healey Band | 20,264 / 20,264 | $395,117 |
| November 21, 1990 | Boise | United States | BSU Pavilion | Jeff Healey Band | — | — |
| November 23, 1990 | Reno | United States | Lawlor Events Center | Jeff Healey Band | 11,330 / 11,330 | $210,093 |
| November 24, 1990 | Paradise | United States | Thomas & Mack Center | Jeff Healey Band | 12,543 / 12,543 | $235,522 |
| November 25, 1990 | Inglewood | United States | Great Western Forum | Jeff Healey Band | 28,043 / 28,043 | $573,330 |
| November 26, 1990 | Inglewood | United States | Great Western Forum | Jeff Healey Band | 28,043 / 28,043 | $573,330 |
| November 29, 1990 | Sacramento | United States | ARCO Arena | Jeff Healey Band | 16,675 / 16,675 | $344,025 |
| November 30, 1990 | Daly City | United States | Cow Palace | Jeff Healey Band | 42,644 / 42,644 | $913,725 |
| December 1, 1990 | Daly City | United States | Cow Palace | Jeff Healey Band | 42,644 / 42,644 | $913,725 |
| December 2, 1990 | Daly City | United States | Cow Palace | Jeff Healey Band | 42,644 / 42,644 | $913,725 |
| December 8, 1990 | Phoenix | United States | Arizona Veterans Memorial Coliseum | Jeff Healey Band | 24,828 / 24,828 | $466,093 |
| December 9, 1990 | Phoenix | United States | Arizona Veterans Memorial Coliseum | Jeff Healey Band | 24,828 / 24,828 | $466,093 |
| December 10, 1990 | San Diego | United States | San Diego Sports Arena | Jeff Healey Band | 12,907 / 12,907 | $265,254 |
| December 13, 1990 | Albuquerque | United States | Tingley Coliseum | Jeff Healey Band | 9,493 / 9,493 | $176,560 |
| December 15, 1990 | Little Rock | United States | Barton Coliseum | Jeff Healey Band | 10,000 / 10,000 | $200,000 |
| December 16, 1990 | Kansas City | United States | Kemper Arena | Jeff Healey Band | 12,404 / 12,404 | $248,080 |
| December 17, 1990 | Oklahoma City | United States | Myriad Convention Center | Jeff Healey Band | 12,500 / 12,500 | $233,660 |
Leg 2: arenas in the United States
| January 4, 1991 | New Orleans | United States | Lakefront Arena | The Black Crowes | 9,500 / 9,500 | $179,100 |
| January 5, 1991 | Memphis | United States | Mid-South Coliseum | The Black Crowes | 20,691 / 20,691 | $413,820 |
| January 6, 1991 | Memphis | United States | Mid-South Coliseum | The Black Crowes | 20,691 / 20,691 | $413,820 |
| January 7, 1991 | Nashville | United States | Nashville Municipal Auditorium | The Black Crowes | 9,900 / 9,900 | $185,880 |
| January 9, 1991 | Louisville | United States | Freedom Hall | The Black Crowes | 14,455 / 14,455 | $281,873 |
| January 10, 1991 | Dayton | United States | Ervin J. Nutter Center | The Black Crowes | 11,160 / 12,198 | $217,620 |
| January 12, 1991 | Charleston | United States | Charleston Civic Center | The Black Crowes | 11,427 / 11,427 | $218,800 |
| January 13, 1991 | Landover | United States | Capital Centre | The Black Crowes | 30,553 / 30,553 | $652,635 |
| January 14, 1991 | Landover | United States | Capital Centre | The Black Crowes | 30,553 / 30,553 | $652,635 |
| January 17, 1991 | Hartford | United States | Hartford Civic Center | The Black Crowes | 24,431 / 24,431 | $461,423 |
| January 18, 1991 | Hartford | United States | Hartford Civic Center | The Black Crowes | 24,431 / 24,431 | $461,423 |
| January 19, 1991 | Worcester | United States | Centrum in Worcester | The Black Crowes | 22,797 / 22,797 | $485,573 |
| January 20, 1991 | Worcester | United States | Centrum in Worcester | The Black Crowes | 22,797 / 22,797 | $485,573 |
| January 23, 1991 | Portland | United States | Cumberland County Civic Center | The Black Crowes | 18,300 / 18,300 | $324,825 |
| January 24, 1991 | Portland | United States | Cumberland County Civic Center | The Black Crowes | 18,300 / 18,300 | $324,825 |
| January 26, 1991 | Uniondale | United States | Nassau Coliseum | The Black Crowes | 12,312 / 12,312 | $258,795 |
| January 28, 1991 | New York City | United States | Madison Square Garden | The Black Crowes | 26,915 / 26,915 | $565,515 |
| January 29, 1991 | New York City | United States | Madison Square Garden | The Black Crowes | 26,915 / 26,915 | $565,515 |
| February 1, 1991 | Buffalo | United States | Buffalo Memorial Auditorium | The Black Crowes | 13,409 / 13,409 | $254,740 |
| February 2, 1991 | Toledo | United States | Savage Hall | The Black Crowes | — | — |
| February 5, 1991 | Albany | United States | Knickerbocker Arena | The Black Crowes | 13,054 / 13,756 | $236,613 |
| February 6, 1991 | Providence | United States | Providence Civic Center | The Black Crowes | 11,732 / 12,450 | $228,774 |
| February 7, 1991 | Hershey | United States | Hersheypark Arena | The Black Crowes | 10,000 / 10,000 | $188,800 |
| February 9, 1991 | Syracuse | United States | Carrier Dome | The Black Crowes | 19,741 / 22,100 | $379,386 |
| February 11, 1991 | Richfield | United States | Coliseum at Richfield | The Black Crowes | 29,224 / 29,224 | $587,034 |
| February 12, 1991 | Richfield | United States | Coliseum at Richfield | The Black Crowes | 29,224 / 29,224 | $587,034 |
| February 15, 1991 | Rosemont | United States | Rosemont Horizon | The Black Crowes | 44,890 / 44,890 | $962,325 |
| February 16, 1991 | Rosemont | United States | Rosemont Horizon | The Black Crowes | 44,890 / 44,890 | $962,325 |
| February 17, 1991 | Rosemont | United States | Rosemont Horizon | The Black Crowes | 44,890 / 44,890 | $962,325 |
| February 18, 1991 | Indianapolis | United States | Market Square Arena | The Black Crowes | 23,181 / 23,181 | $417,027 |
| February 19, 1991 | Indianapolis | United States | Market Square Arena | The Black Crowes | 23,181 / 23,181 | $417,027 |
| February 21, 1991 | Auburn Hills | United States | Palace of Auburn Hills | The Black Crowes | 49,964 / 49,864 | $1,071,383 |
| February 22, 1991 | Auburn Hills | United States | Palace of Auburn Hills | The Black Crowes | 49,964 / 49,864 | $1,071,383 |
| February 23, 1991 | Auburn Hills | United States | Palace of Auburn Hills | The Black Crowes | 49,964 / 49,864 | $1,071,383 |
| February 25, 1991 | Lexington | United States | Rupp Arena | The Black Crowes | 14,329 / 14,329 | $282,998 |
| February 26, 1991 | Carbondale | United States | SIU Arena | The Black Crowes | — | — |
| February 27, 1991 | Chattanooga | United States | UTC Arena | The Black Crowes | — | — |
| March 2, 1991 | Cincinnati | United States | Riverfront Coliseum | The Black Crowes | 11,346 / 11,346 | $218,879 |
| March 3, 1991 | Knoxville | United States | Thompson–Boling Arena | The Black Crowes | 16,601 / 16,601 | $314,747 |
| March 11, 1991 | Philadelphia | United States | Philadelphia Spectrum | The Black Crowes | 27,878 / 27,878 | $598,230 |
| March 12, 1991 | Philadelphia | United States | Philadelphia Spectrum | The Black Crowes | 27,878 / 27,878 | $598,230 |
| March 14, 1991 | Pittsburgh | United States | Pittsburgh Civic Arena | The Black Crowes | 26,114 / 26,114 | $511,568 |
| March 15, 1991 | Pittsburgh | United States | Pittsburgh Civic Arena | The Black Crowes | 26,114 / 26,114 | $511,568 |
| March 17, 1991 | Richmond | United States | Richmond Coliseum | The Black Crowes | — | — |
| March 20, 1991 | Chapel Hill | United States | Dean E. Smith Center | The Black Crowes | 12,301 / 12,301 | $246,140 |
| March 21, 1991 | Roanoke | United States | Roanoke Civic Center | The Black Crowes | 10,938 / 10,938 | $210,240 |
| March 24, 1991 | Atlanta | United States | The Omni | The Black Crowes | 38,539 / 38,539 | $769,098 |
| March 25, 1991 | Atlanta | United States | The Omni | The Black Crowes | 38,539 / 38,539 | $769,098 |
| March 26, 1991 | Atlanta | United States | The Omni | Michelle Malone & Drag the River | 38,539 / 38,539 | $769,098 |
| March 29, 1991 | Charlotte | United States | Charlotte Coliseum | Michelle Malone & Drag the River | 18,616 / 18,616 | $358,700 |
| March 30, 1991 | Columbia | United States | Carolina Coliseum | Michelle Malone & Drag the River | 10,444 / 10,444 | $198,240 |
| April 2, 1991 | Savannah | United States | Savannah Civic Center | Michelle Malone & Drag the River | 8,137 / 8,137 | $150,760 |
| April 3, 1991 | Jacksonville | United States | Jacksonville Coliseum | Michelle Malone & Drag the River | 11,676 / 11,676 | $221,600 |
| April 4, 1991 | North Fort Myers | United States | Lee Civic Center | Dreams So Real | 9,000 / 9,000 | $171,580 |
| April 6, 1991 | Miami | United States | Miami Arena | Dreams So Real | 24,471 / 24,471 | $521,753 |
| April 7, 1991 | Miami | United States | Miami Arena | Dreams So Real | 24,471 / 24,471 | $521,753 |
| April 10, 1991 | Lakeland | United States | Lakeland Civic Center | Hall Aflame | 19,054 / 19,054 | $397,019 |
| April 11, 1991 | Lakeland | United States | Lakeland Civic Center | Hall Aflame | 19,054 / 19,054 | $397,019 |
| April 13, 1991 | Pensacola | United States | Pensacola Civic Center | Hall Aflame | 10,027 / 10,027 | $189,820 |
| April 14, 1991 | Biloxi | United States | Mississippi Coast Coliseum | Hall Aflame | 11,944 / 11,944 | $224,560 |
| April 17, 1991 | Birmingham | United States | Birmingham–Jefferson Civic Center | Hall Aflame | 15,202 / 15,202 | $296,234 |
| April 18, 1991 | Jackson | United States | Mississippi Coliseum | Hall Aflame | 10,384 / 10,384 | $191,360 |
| April 19, 1991 | Shreveport | United States | Hirsch Memorial Coliseum | Hall Aflame | 10,350 / 10,350 | $194,780 |
| April 20, 1991 | Lafayette | United States | Cajundome | Hall Aflame | 10,802 / 10,802 | $203,320 |
| April 22, 1991 | Dallas | United States | Reunion Arena | John Mayall & the Bluesbreakers | 28,719 / 28,719 | $590,085 |
| April 23, 1991 | Dallas | United States | Reunion Arena | John Mayall & the Bluesbreakers | 28,719 / 28,719 | $590,085 |
| April 25, 1991 | Houston | United States | The Summit | John Mayall & the Bluesbreakers | 51,784 / 51,784 | $1,088,612 |
| April 26, 1991 | Houston | United States | The Summit | John Mayall & the Bluesbreakers | 51,784 / 51,784 | $1,088,612 |
| April 27, 1991 | Houston | United States | The Summit | John Mayall & the Bluesbreakers | 51,784 / 51,784 | $1,088,612 |
| April 28, 1991 | Houston | United States | The Summit | John Mayall & the Bluesbreakers | 51,784 / 51,784 | $1,088,612 |
| April 29, 1991 | San Antonio | United States | Henry B. Gonzalez Convention Center | John Mayall & the Bluesbreakers | — | — |
| May 1, 1991 | Las Cruces | United States | Pan American Center | John Mayall & the Bluesbreakers | 10,205 / 10,205 | $192,480 |
| May 2, 1991 | Lubbock | United States | Lubbock Municipal Coliseum | John Mayall & the Bluesbreakers | 10,500 / 10,500 | $196,160 |
| May 3, 1991 | Austin | United States | Frank Erwin Center | Jay Aaron | 14,701 / 14,701 | $296,528 |
Leg 3: stadiums in Europe
| June 5, 1991 | Helsinki | Finland | Oulunkylä Sportspark | Thunder | — | — |
| June 8, 1991 | Stockholm | Sweden | Söderstadion | Desperado, Thunder | — | — |
| June 9, 1991 | Stockholm | Sweden | Söderstadion | Roger McGuinn, Thunder | — | — |
| June 12, 1991 | Copenhagen | Denmark | Gentofte Stadion | Bryan Adams, Thunder | — | — |
| June 15, 1991 | Mannheim | Germany | Maimarktgelände | Bryan Adams | — | — |
| June 16, 1991 | Nuremberg | Germany | Zeppelinfeld | Bryan Adams | — | — |
| June 19, 1991 | Berlin | Germany | Waldbühne | Bryan Adams | — | — |
| June 20, 1991 | Berlin | Germany | Waldbühne | Bryan Adams | — | — |
| June 22, 1991 | Cologne | Germany | Müngersdorfer Stadion | Bryan Adams | — | — |
| June 23, 1991 | Basel | Switzerland | St. Jakob Stadium | Bryan Adams | — | — |
| June 25, 1991 | Toulouse | France | Palais des Sports | Bryan Adams | — | — |
| June 27, 1991 | Nantes | France | Stade Marcel Saupin | Bryan Adams | — | — |
| June 28, 1991 | Paris | France | Palais Omnisports de Paris-Bercy | Bryan Adams | — | — |
| June 29, 1991 | Paris | France | Palais Omnisports de Paris-Bercy | Bryan Adams | — | — |
| June 30, 1991 | Paris | France | Palais Omnisports de Paris-Bercy | Bryan Adams | — | — |
| July 2, 1991 | Lyon | France | Halle Tony Garnier | Bryan Adams | — | — |
| July 3, 1991 | Marseille | France | Vitrolles Stadium | Bryan Adams | — | — |
| July 6, 1991 | Milton Keynes | England | Milton Keynes Bowl | Bryan Adams, The Law | — | — |
Leg 4: arenas and amphitheaters in North America
| August 1, 1991 | Salt Lake City | United States | Salt Palace | Extreme | 9,940 / 9,940 | $198,800 |
| August 3, 1991 | Bismarck | United States | Bismarck Civic Center | Extreme | — | — |
| August 4, 1991 | Sioux Falls | United States | Sioux Falls Arena | Extreme | 6,970 / 8,000 | $139,400 |
| August 6, 1991 | Rapid City | United States | Rushmore Plaza Civic Center | Extreme | — | — |
| August 10, 1991 | San Jose | United States | Spartan Stadium | Steve Miller, Eric Johnson | — | — |
| August 11, 1991 | Irvine | United States | Irvine Meadows Amphitheatre | Extreme | — | — |
| August 12, 1991 | Tucson | United States | McKale Center | Extreme | — | — |
| August 14, 1991 | Odessa | United States | Ector County Coliseum | Extreme | — | — |
| August 16, 1991 | Bonner Springs | United States | Sandstone Amphitheatre | Extreme | — | — |
| August 17, 1991 | Maryland Heights | United States | Riverport Amphitheatre | Extreme | — | — |
| August 18, 1991 | Tulsa | United States | Tulsa Convention Center | Extreme | — | — |
| August 20, 1991 | Des Moines | United States | Veterans Memorial Auditorium | Extreme | — | — |
| August 21, 1991 | Duluth | United States | DECC Arena | Extreme | — | — |
| August 22, 1991 | Rockford | United States | Rockford MetroCentre | Extreme | — | — |
| August 23, 1991 | Tinley Park | United States | World Music Theatre | Extreme | — | — |
| August 24, 1991 | East Lansing | United States | Breslin Student Events Center | Extreme | — | — |
| August 27, 1991 | Noblesville | United States | Deer Creek Music Center | Extreme | 8,067 / 16,400 | — |
| August 29, 1991 | Saratoga Springs | United States | Saratoga Performing Arts Center | Extreme | — | — |
| August 30, 1991 | East Rutherford | United States | Brendan Byrne Arena | Extreme | — | — |
| August 31, 1991 | Old Orchard Beach | United States | Seashore Performing Arts Center | Extreme | — | — |
| September 1, 1991 | Mansfield | United States | Great Woods Center | Extreme | — | — |
| September 3, 1991 | Halifax | Canada | Halifax Metro Centre | Extreme | — | — |
| September 6, 1991 | Hamilton | Canada | Copps Coliseum | Extreme | — | — |
| September 7, 1991 | Ottawa | Canada | Ottawa Civic Centre | Extreme | — | — |
| September 11, 1991 | Wallkill | United States | Orange County Speedway | Extreme | — | — |
| September 13, 1991 | Wheeling | United States | WesBanco Arena | Extreme | — | — |
| September 14, 1991 | Baltimore | United States | Baltimore Arena | Extreme | — | — |
| September 15, 1991 | Johnson City | United States | Freedom Hall Civic Center | Extreme | — | — |
| September 18, 1991 | Murfreesboro | United States | Murphy Center | Extreme | — | — |
| September 19, 1991 | Huntsville | United States | Von Braun Civic Center | Extreme | — | — |
| September 20, 1991 | Monroe | United States | Monroe Civic Center | Extreme | — | — |
| September 27, 1991 | Mexico City | Mexico | Palacio de los Deportes | — | — | — |
