= Live at Montreux 2013 =

Live album by ZZ Top
- Released: July 22, 2014
- Recorded: July 10, 2013
- Venues: Auditorium Stravinsky (Montreux, Switzerland), as part of the Montreux Jazz Festival
- Genre: Rock
- Length: 93 mins approx.
- Label: Eagle Vision

ZZ Top chronology
La Futura (2012)	Live at Montreux 2013 (2014)	Tonite at Midnight: Live Greatest Hits from Around the World (2016)

Live at Montreux 2013 is a live album of a concert performed by ZZ Top on July 10, 2013 at the Montreux Jazz Festival, Switzerland, released in July 2014 on DVD and Blu-ray by Eagle Vision.

The set list blends tracks from early seventies albums such as Tres Hombres and Fandango through their eighties period with Eliminator and Afterburner, and up to their most recent release and return to their blues roots with La Futura. The middle section of the concert features a jazz-blues tribute to the late Montreux Jazz Festival founder Claude Nobs, with guest appearances by Mike Flanigin on Hammond Organ and Van Wilks on guitar.

Classic Rock rated it three and a half stars.

== Track listing ==
1. "Got Me Under Pressure"
2. "Waitin' for the Bus"
3. "Jesus Just Left Chicago"
4. "Gimme All Your Lovin'"
5. "Pincushion"
6. "I Gotsta Get Paid"
7. "Flyin' High"
8. "Kiko"
9. "I Loved a Woman" (Freddie King cover)
10. "Foxey Lady" (The Jimi Hendrix Experience cover)
11. "My Head's in Mississippi"
12. "Chartreuse"
13. "Sharp Dressed Man"
14. "Legs"
15. "Tube Snake Boogie"
16. "La Grange" (with Sloppy Drunk Jam)
17. "Tush"

Bonus Material:

- Interview with Billy Gibbons and Dusty Hill
- Billy Gibbons on the Montreux Jazz Festival
