= Greatest Hits (ZZ Top video) =

Video by ZZ Top
- Released: 1992
- Recorded: 1983–1992
- Genre: Rock
- Label: Warner Bros.

ZZ Top chronology
Greatest Hits (1992)	Live from Texas (2008)

Greatest Hits is a music video compilation by ZZ Top. It was released in 1992 by Warner Bros. Records. It is a companion to Greatest Hits, a 1992 compilation album released the same year.

== Track listing ==
All songs by Billy Gibbons, Dusty Hill, Frank Beard except where noted.

1. "Gimme All Your Lovin'"
2. "Sharp Dressed Man"
3. "Legs"
4. "TV Dinners"
5. "Sleeping Bag"
6. "Stages"
7. "Rough Boy"
8. "Velcro Fly"
9. "Give It Up"
10. "My Head's in Mississippi"
11. "Burger Man"
12. "Viva Las Vegas" (Doc Pomus, Mort Shuman)

== Certifications ==
Region	Certification	Certified units/sales
Australia (ARIA)	Platinum	15,000^{^}
^{^} Shipments figures based on certification alone.
