= Live from Texas =

2008 live album by ZZ Top

Video by ZZ Top
- Released: June 24, 2008
- Recorded: November 1, 2007
- Venue: Nokia Theatre (Grand Prairie, Texas)
- Genre: Rock
- Length: 154 minutes
- Label: Eagle Vision
- Director: Milton Lage
- Producer: Barry Ehrmann

ZZ Top chronology
Greatest Hits (1992)	Live from Texas (2008)	Double Down Live: 1980 & 2008 (2009)

Live from Texas

Live album by ZZ Top
- Released: November 4, 2008
- Recorded: November 1, 2007
- Venue: Nokia Theatre (Grand Prairie, Texas)
- Genre: Rock
- Length: 75:52
- Label: Eagle Rock

ZZ Top chronology
Rancho Texicano (2004)	Live from Texas (2008)	Double Down Live: 1980 & 2008 (2009)

Live from Texas is a live DVD/Blu-ray by ZZ Top. It was recorded on November 1, 2007, at the Nokia Theatre in Grand Prairie, Texas, and released on June 24, 2008, by Eagle Rock Records. It was also released on audio CD in Europe on October 28, 2008, and in the US on November 4, 2008. A vinyl version is also available in Europe.

== Track listing ==
All songs by Billy Gibbons, Dusty Hill, Frank Beard except where noted.

=== DVD ===
1. "Got Me Under Pressure" – 4:24
2. "Waitin' for the Bus" (Gibbons, Hill) – 2:54
3. "Jesus Just Left Chicago" – 4:58
4. "I'm Bad, I'm Nationwide" – 4:40
5. "Pincushion" – 5:06
6. "Cheap Sunglasses" – 4:50
7. "Pearl Necklace" – 3:49
8. "Heard It on the X" – 3:51
9. "Just Got Paid" (Gibbons, Bill Ham) – 7:35
10. "Rough Boy" – 6:29
11. "Blue Jean Blues" – 4:57
12. "Gimme All Your Lovin'" – 4:35
13. "Sharp Dressed Man" – 4:55
14. "Legs" – 5:19
15. "Tube Snake Boogie" – 3:03
16. "La Grange" – 7:41
17. "Tush" – 6:14

Foxy Lady was also played, but was included as bonus track on the DVD.

=== CD ===
Due to the CD having a shorter run time than the DVD, "Heard It on the X" and "Pincushion" are omitted from the CD. Foxy Lady was also played, but was not included on the CD.

1. "Got Me Under Pressure"
2. "Waitin' for the Bus" (Gibbons, Hill)
3. "Jesus Just Left Chicago"
4. "I'm Bad, I'm Nationwide"
5. "Cheap Sunglasses"
6. "Pearl Necklace"
7. "Just Got Paid" (Gibbons, Ham)
8. "Rough Boy"
9. "Blues Intro"
10. "Blue Jean Blues"
11. "Gimme All Your Lovin'"
12. "Sharp Dressed Man"
13. "Legs"
14. "Tube Snake Boogie"
15. "La Grange"
16. "Tush"

== Personnel ==
- Frank Beard – drums, percussion
- Billy Gibbons – vocals, guitar, harmonica
- Dusty Hill – bass guitar, backing vocals, lead vocals on "Tush", co-lead vocals on "Got Me Under Pressure", "Pearl Necklace", and "Heard It on the X"

== Charts ==
Chart (2008)	Peak position
Australian Music DVDs Chart	3
Austrian Music DVDs Chart	1
Belgian (Flanders) Music DVDs Chart	4
Belgian (Wallonia) Music DVDs Chart	3
Danish Music DVDs Chart	6
Dutch Music DVDs Chart	4
Finnish Music DVDs Chart	1
German Albums Chart	21
Italian Music DVDs Chart	10
Norwegian Music DVDs Chart	2
Swedish Music DVDs Chart	1
Swiss Music DVDs Chart	2
US Music Videos Chart	1

== Certifications ==
Region	Certification	Certified units/sales
Australia (ARIA)	Gold	7,500^{^}
Canada (Music Canada)	5× Platinum	50,000^{^}
Finland (Musiikkituottajat)	Gold	6,030
Germany (BVMI)	Platinum	50,000^{^}
United States (RIAA)	2× Platinum	200,000^{^}
^{^} Shipments figures based on certification alone.
