= One Foot in the Blues =

Compilation album by ZZ Top
- Released: November 22, 1994
- Genre: Blues
- Length: 65:55
- Label: Warner Bros.
- Producer: Bill Ham

ZZ Top chronology
Antenna (1994)	One Foot in the Blues (1994)	Rhythmeen (1996)

Professional ratings
Review scores
Source	Rating
AllMusic	2/5 stars

One Foot in the Blues is a compilation album by the American rock band ZZ Top, released in 1994 (see 1994 in music). The album contains a selection of the band's songs which fall into the blues genre. With the exception of the songs taken from the Degüello, El Loco, Eliminator and Recycler albums, the 1987 digital remixes were used.

== Track listing ==
All tracks are written by Billy Gibbons, Dusty Hill, and Frank Beard except where noted.

No.	Title	Writer(s)	Original album	Length
1.	"Brown Sugar"	Billy Gibbons	ZZ Top's First Album (1971)	5:20
2.	"Just Got Back from Baby's"	Billy Gibbons; Bill Ham	ZZ Top's First Album	4:09
3.	"A Fool for Your Stockings"		Degüello (1979)	4:16
4.	"I Need You Tonight"		Eliminator (1983)	6:15
5.	"She Loves My Automobile"		Degüello	2:23
6.	"Hi Fi Mama"		Degüello	2:24
7.	"Hot, Blue and Righteous"	Billy Gibbons	Tres Hombres (1973)	3:17
8.	"My Head's in Mississippi"		Recycler (1990)	4:20
9.	"Lowdown in the Street"		Degüello	2:49
10.	"If I Could Only Flag Her Down"		Eliminator	3:39
11.	"Apologies to Pearly" (Instrumental)	Billy Gibbons; Dusty Hill; Frank Beard; Bill Ham	Rio Grande Mud (1972)	2:44
12.	"Sure Got Cold After the Rain Fell"	Billy Gibbons	Rio Grande Mud	6:47
13.	"Bar-B-Q"	Billy Gibbons; Bill Ham	Rio Grande Mud	3:21
14.	"Old Man"		ZZ Top's First Album (1971)	3:32
15.	"Certified Blues"	Billy Gibbons; Frank Beard; Bill Ham	ZZ Top's First Album	3:25
16.	"2000 Blues"		Recycler	4:42
17.	"Heaven, Hell or Houston"		El Loco (1981)	2:32
Total length:				65:55

== Personnel ==
=== ZZ Top ===
- Billy Gibbons – guitar, vocals
- Dusty Hill – bass guitar, keyboards, backing vocals, lead vocal on "Hi Fi Mama"
- Frank Beard – drums, percussion

=== Production ===
- Producer – Bill Ham
- Engineers – Robin Brian, Joe Hardy, Terry Manning
- Mastering – Bob Ludwig
- Design – Jeri Heiden
- Liner notes – Bill Bentley, Frank Beard, Billy Gibbons, Dusty Hill

== Charts ==
Chart (1995)	Peak position
Blues Albums (Billboard)	10
