= Greatest Hits (ZZ Top album) =

Greatest hits album by ZZ Top
- Released: April 14, 1992
- Genres: Disco metal; rock; blues
- Length: 72:43 (CD); 51:27 (vinyl)
- Label: Warner Bros.
- Producer: Bill Ham

ZZ Top chronology
Recycler (1990)	Greatest Hits (1992)	Antenna (1994)

Singles from Greatest Hits
- 1. "Viva Las Vegas" Released: 1992

Professional ratings
Review scores
Source	Rating
AllMusic	4.5/5 stars
Christgau's Consumer Guide	A−
Encyclopedia of Popular Music	4/5 stars
The Great Rock Discography	9/10
NME	7/10
The Rolling Stone Album Guide	4/5 stars
Select	4/5 stars

Greatest Hits is a greatest hits album by the American rock band ZZ Top, released in 1992.

== Overview ==
Most of the songs come from albums released during 1979–1990, from Degüello through Recycler. Exceptions include remixes of "Tush" and "La Grange", and the non-album tracks "Viva Las Vegas" and "Gun Love". "Viva Las Vegas" was previously released as a single.

The vinyl version of the album omitted four tracks included on the CD version ("Cheap Sunglasses", "I'm Bad, I'm Nationwide", "Pearl Necklace", and "Planet of Women") and some tracks on the vinyl version are also edited from the original running length.

A companion video album titled Greatest Hits: The Video Collection was also released.

== Critical reception ==
In a contemporary review, Andy Gill of The Independent credited manager/producer Bill Ham's use of computer technology on ZZ Top's mid-1980s material for transforming "what was effectively a straight-ahead boogie band into the apotheosis of disco metal", adding that Greatest Hits demonstrates this transformation because it naturally concentrates largely on "the computerized period" of the band's career. He felt the compilation was largely "an exercise in swagger on cruise control", and mentioned the minority of straight boogie tracks, including 1981's "Tube Snake Boogie", described as "the earliest indication of the powerglide computer-boogie style that would come to dominate."

In the NME, Andy Fyfe felt that ZZ Top were especially deserving of a greatest hits compilation and similarly noted its emphasis on the band's "deep space blues craziness" of Eliminator onwards, believing that the pre-Eliminator material was better served by an earlier greatest hits record, The Best of ZZ Top (1977). Fyfe concluded that, although some argue that "a sense of humour and blistering cyborg blues is no defence of a sexist band", this assessment misses the point. Andrew Collins of Select wrote that Greatest Hits would remind "doubting Thomases" that, beneath ZZ Top's visual gimmicks, they were "one of the most original and consistently entertaining rock bands of the last two decades", recommending that listeners enjoy it with a six-pack of beer.

In Christgau's Consumer Guide: Albums of the '90s (2000), Robert Christgau hailed ZZ Top as "the class of arena blues, and they also write songs", and felt that "nonarean types" would enjoy "Got Me Under Pressure". Stephen Thomas Erlewine, in a retrospective review for AllMusic, commented that Greatest Hits is not "a perfect roundup of ZZ Top's superstar years of the '80s" but still offers "the MTV-era basics", and deemed it a useful complement to the 1970s-focused The Best of ZZ Top. However, Erlewine lamented the inclusion of some new tracks and album cuts. In The Rough Guide to Rock (1999), Neil Nixon recommends it as one of the two best ZZ Top albums, alongside Degüello (1979), as it contains all of their biggest-sellers from the 1980s as well as "a few of the ruggest 70s stage favourites."

== Track listing ==
=== CD ===
All tracks are written by Billy Gibbons, Dusty Hill, and Frank Beard, except where noted.

No.	Title	Writer(s)	Original album	Length
1.	"Gimme All Your Lovin'"		Eliminator (1983)	3:59
2.	"Sharp Dressed Man"		Eliminator	4:14
3.	"Rough Boy"		Afterburner (1985)	4:50
4.	"Tush" (Six Pack remix)		The Six Pack (1987); originally from Fandango! (1975)	2:15
5.	"My Head's in Mississippi"		Recycler (1990)	4:21
6.	"Pearl Necklace"		El Loco (1981)	4:01
7.	"I'm Bad, I'm Nationwide"		Degüello (1979)	4:46
8.	"Viva Las Vegas" (Elvis Presley cover)	Doc Pomus; Mort Shuman	Previously unreleased	4:47
9.	"Doubleback"		Recycler	3:53
10.	"Gun Love"		Previously unreleased	3:43
11.	"Got Me Under Pressure"		Eliminator	4:00
12.	"Give It Up"		Recycler	3:32
13.	"Cheap Sunglasses"		Degüello	4:47
14.	"Sleeping Bag"		Afterburner	4:02
15.	"Planet of Women"		Afterburner	4:09
16.	"La Grange" (Six Pack remix)		The Six Pack; originally from Tres Hombres (1973)	3:52
17.	"Tube Snake Boogie"		El Loco	3:02
18.	"Legs" (Dance remix)		Eliminator	4:31
Total length:				72:43

=== Vinyl ===
Side one
No.	Title	Writer(s)	Original album	Length
1.	"Gimme All Your Lovin'"		Eliminator	3:27
2.	"Sharp Dressed Man"		Eliminator	3:03
3.	"Rough Boy"		Afterburner	4:50
4.	"Tush" (Six Pack remix)		The Six Pack	2:15
5.	"My Head's in Mississippi"		Recycler	4:19
6.	"Viva Las Vegas"	Pomus; Shuman	Previously unreleased	4:47
7.	"Legs" (Dance remix)		Eliminator	4:31

Side two
No.	Title	Original album	Length
1.	"Doubleback"	Recycler	3:53
2.	"Gun Love"	Previously unreleased	3:43
3.	"Got Me Under Pressure"	Eliminator	4:00
4.	"Give It Up"	Recycler	3:32
5.	"Sleeping Bag"	Afterburner	4:02
6.	"La Grange" (Six Pack remix)	The Six Pack	3:52
7.	"Tube Snake Boogie"	El Loco	3:02
Total length:			51:27

== Personnel ==
- Billy Gibbons – guitar, lead vocals (1–3, 5–7, 9–18)
- Dusty Hill – bass guitar, backing and lead vocals (4, 8), keyboard
- Frank Beard – drums, percussion

== Production ==
- Producer – Bill Ham
- Engineer – Joe Hardy, Bob Ludwig, Terry Manning
- Art Direction – Jeri Heiden
- Design – Leslie Wintner
- Photography – Glen Wexler
- Liner Notes – Bob Merlis, Davin Seay

== Charts ==
=== Weekly charts ===
Chart (1992)	Peak position
Australian Albums (ARIA)	2
Austrian Albums (Ö3 Austria)	2
Canada Albums (The Record)	4
Dutch Albums (Album Top 100)	7
Finnish Albums (Suomen virallinen lista)	8
German Albums (Offizielle Top 100)	4
Hungarian Albums (MAHASZ)	37
New Zealand Albums (RMNZ)	2
Norwegian Albums (VG-lista)	7
Swedish Albums (Sverigetopplistan)	2
Swiss Albums (Schweizer Hitparade)	1
UK Albums (Official Charts)	5
US Billboard 200	9

=== Year-end charts ===
Chart (1992)	Position
Australian Albums (ARIA)	13
Austrian Albums (Ö3 Austria)	19
Dutch Albums (Album Top 100)	35
German Albums (Offizielle Top 100)	28
New Zealand Albums (RMNZ)	39
Swiss Albums (Schweizer Hitparade)	15
US Billboard 200	56

== Certifications ==
Region	Certification	Certified units/sales
Australia (ARIA)	4× Platinum	280,000^{^}
Austria (IFPI Austria)	Platinum	50,000^{*}
Belgium (BRMA)	Platinum	50,000^{*}
Canada (Music Canada)	Platinum	100,000^{^}
Finland (Musiikkituottajat)	Platinum	76,129
France (SNEP)	Diamond	750,000^{*}
Netherlands (NVPI)	Platinum	100,000^{^}
Switzerland (IFPI Switzerland)	Platinum	50,000^{^}
United Kingdom (BPI)	Platinum	300,000^{‡}
United Kingdom (BPI) video	Gold	25,000^{*}
United States (RIAA)	3× Platinum	3,000,000^{^}
United States (RIAA) video	Platinum	100,000^{^}
^{*} Sales figures based on certification alone.^{^} Shipments figures based on certification alone.^{‡} Sales+streaming figures based on certification alone.
