= Elwood Francis =

American guitar tech and bassist (born 1961)

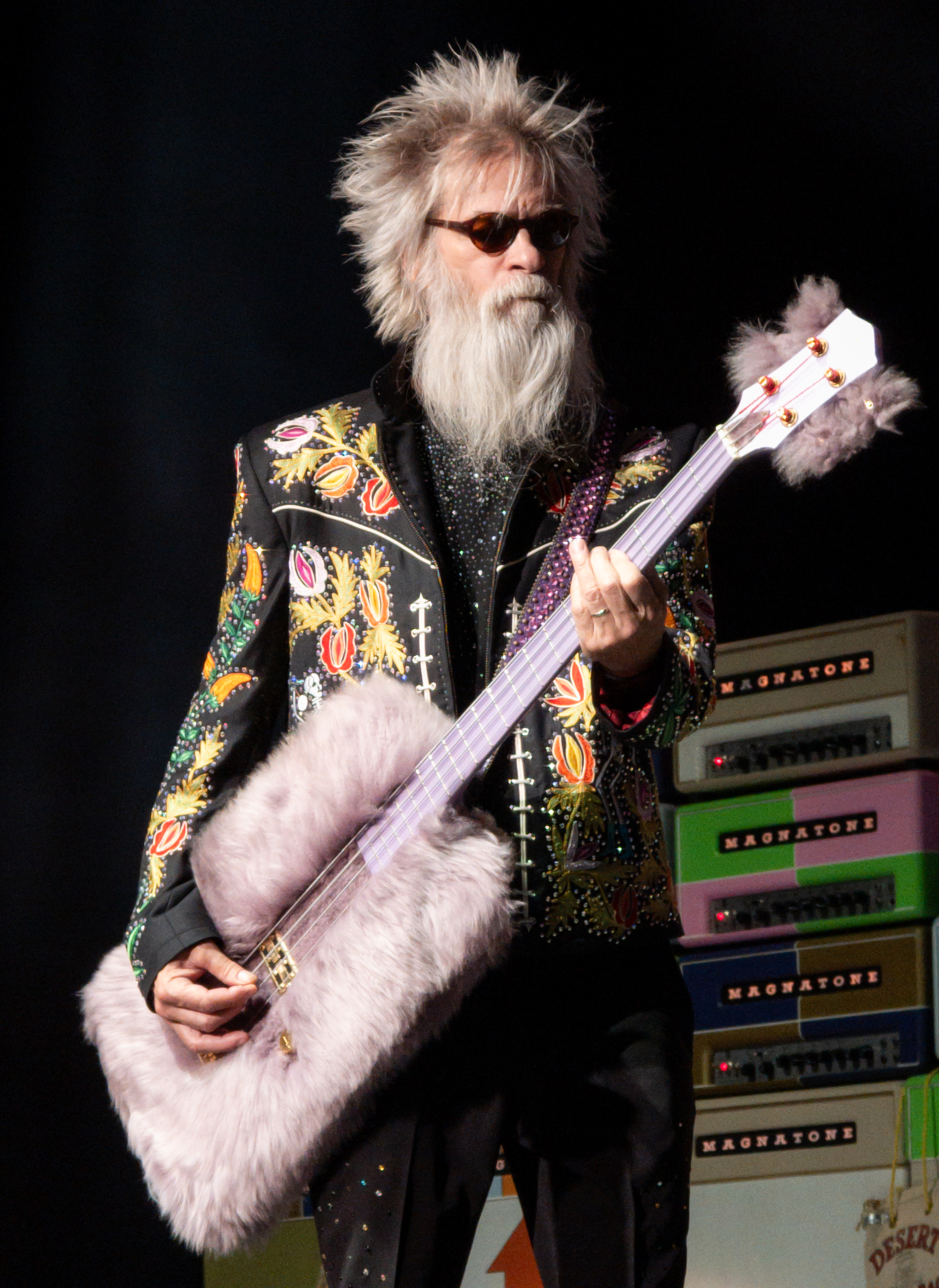
- Francis with ZZ Top in 2025

Background information
- Born: August 23, 1961 (age 65); Lexington, Kentucky, U.S.
- Genre: Rock
- Occupations: Guitar tech; musician
- Instrument: Bass guitar
- Member of: The Mighty Skullhead; ZZ Top

Elwood Francis (born August 23, 1961) is an American guitar tech and bassist. Francis was the longtime guitar technician for bassist Dusty Hill of ZZ Top, who chose Francis as his replacement while on his deathbed in 2021.

== Early career ==
From Lexington, Kentucky, Francis started playing guitars at age 13 after listening to "Telstar" by the Tornados. His grandfather got him his first guitar. He started working in guitar tech through Joe Perry. His influences are Frank Zappa, Geordie Walker, Steve Jones, Bob Stinson, and Kenny Hillman.

Francis performs in his own group, the Mighty Skullhead, a band he formed in the 1980s.

== Work with ZZ Top ==
Francis long worked as ZZ Top's guitar technician.

In 2021, Francis claimed to be largely responsible for Hill quitting marijuana. In an Instagram post, he said Hill was smoking the drug in a hotel in Amsterdam when Francis noticed a metal bar underneath one of the hotel windows. Francis jumped out of the window while holding onto the bar, something Hill could not see from his perspective, making it look like he had committed suicide. Hill apparently never smoked marijuana again after the incident.

In July 2021, Hill dropped out of a concert due to a hip injury, and Francis was asked to fill in. A few days later, Hill died at the age of 72. Before his death, Hill asked the other band members to hire Francis as his replacement. Francis played his first show as an official member of ZZ Top on July 30, 2021, in Tuscaloosa, Alabama. In 2024, Francis said that it still feels "weird" taking Hill's place in the band, and does not consider himself an official member of the band.

In 2022, Francis went viral for performing on stage with a 17-string bass guitar, an instrument he found "late at night while internet surfing on one of those Chinese websites". He sent the listing to Billy Gibbons and they ordered the bass from China. Francis has admitted that he hates playing the instrument as it is hard to play and he struggles finding the frets on the bass' neck. The bass was later eventually discovered to be a knockoff of Jared Dines' Ormsby 18-string.
