= La Futura =

Studio album by ZZ Top
- Released: September 10, 2012
- Studios: Foam Box Recordings (Houston, Texas)
- Genre: Blues rock
- Length: 39:18
- Labels: American Recordings; Universal Republic
- Producers: Rick Rubin; Billy Gibbons

ZZ Top chronology
Double Down Live: 1980 & 2008 (2009)	La Futura (2012)	Live at Montreux 2013 (2014)

Singles from La Futura
- 1. "I Gotsta Get Paid" Released: 2012

Professional ratings
Aggregate scores
Source	Rating
Metacritic	73/100
Review scores
Source	Rating
AllMusic	4.5/5 stars
The Austin Chronicle	2.5/5 stars
American Songwriter	3.5/5 stars
Daily Express	1/5
The Guardian	4/5 stars
Mojo	4/5 stars
Rolling Stone	3.5/5 stars
The Sydney Morning Herald	4.5/5 stars
Q	3/5 stars
Uncut	3.5/5 stars

La Futura is the fifteenth studio album by American rock band ZZ Top, released on September 8, 2012. It is the band's first album in nine years, following Mescalero, and peaked at number 5 on the Billboard "Top Rock Albums" chart. La Futura is also the last studio album released before bassist Dusty Hill and drummer Frank Beard died in 2021 and 2026, respectively.

== Overview ==
La Futura was recorded at The Foambox Recordings in Houston, Texas. The album title and album art were unveiled on ZZ Top's homepage on 3 August 2012 at 11:45 am. The album contains 10 tracks. "We thought long and hard about what this album should be," Gibbons said in a press release. "We wanted to recall the directness of our early stuff but not turn our backs on contemporary technology. The result of this melding of the past and the present is, of course, La Futura."

The album's lead single, "I Gotsta Get Paid", is a cover of "25 Lighters" by Houston hip hop artist DJ DMD. The song "Chartreuse" was inspired by the famous French liqueur, which the band discovered at the 2011 Musilac Music Festival in the French town of Aix-les-Bains.

== Release ==
The first four album tracks —"I Gotsta Get Paid", "Chartreuse", "Consumption" and "Over You"—were first released on 5 June 2012 as an iTunes-only collection titled Texicali, which met with strong sales and glowing reviews. Music Radar summed up the tunes as "fresh, vital roadhouse blues." Another track, "Flyin' High", appropriately made its world premiere in space, when the then-unfinished song was played on board a Soyuz spacecraft during its launch to the International Space Station in June 2011 at the request of the NASA astronaut Mike Fossum, a long-time ZZ Top fan and friend. Two bonus tracks, titled "Threshold of a Breakdown" and "Drive-By Lover", were released on CDs sold exclusively at Best Buy stores.

== Reception ==
Following its release, the album received mostly positive reviews. William Clark of Guitar International wrote, "La Futura is an impressive return to form for this infamous southern rock trio, and includes some of the best music ZZ Top has ever pushed out." Stephen Thomas Erlewine of Allmusic also praised the album, calling it their best album since Eliminator in 1983, while writing that "ZZ Top are celebrating everything that they've taken for granted for decades – they're embracing the sleazy boogie, the dirty jokes, the locomotive riffs, the saturated blues, the persistent lecherous leer, and by doing so they finally sound like themselves again."

== Track listing ==
Standard edition
No.	Title	Writer(s)	Length
1.	"I Gotsta Get Paid"	Dorie Dorsey, Billy Gibbons, Kyle West, Al B. Sure!, Joe Hardy, G.L. Moon	4:03
2.	"Chartreuse"	Gibbons, Dusty Hill, Frank Beard, Moon	2:57
3.	"Consumption"	Gibbons	3:47
4.	"Over You"	Gibbons, Tom Hambridge	4:29
5.	"Heartache in Blue"	Gibbons, Trey Bruce	4:09
6.	"I Don't Wanna Lose, Lose, You"	Gibbons, Hambridge	4:20
7.	"Flyin' High"	Gibbons, Austin Hanks, D. Sardy	4:17
8.	"It's Too Easy Mañana"	David Rawlings, Gillian Welch; additional lyrics by Gibbons	4:47
9.	"Big Shiny Nine"	Gibbons, Hardy, Moon	3:11
10.	"Have a Little Mercy"	Gibbons	3:18
Total length:			39:18

Deluxe Edition/Best Buy Bonus Tracks
No.	Title	Writer(s)	Length
11.	"Threshold of a Breakdown"	Gibbons, Hambridge	3:29
12.	"Drive by Lover"	Gibbons, Van Wilks	3:03
Total length:			45:50

== Personnel ==
ZZ Top

- Billy Gibbons – vocals (lead on all but "Drive by Lover"), guitar, production
- Dusty Hill – bass, keyboards, vocals (lead on "Drive by Lover")
- Frank Beard – drums

Additional musicians

- Joe Hardy – piano, Hammond B3 organ, recording
- James Harman – harmonica
- Dave Sardy – piano, Hammond B3 organ, mixing

Technical personnel

- Cameron Barton – engineering
- Ryan Castle – engineering
- Pedro Chapouris – photography
- Ross Halfin – photography
- Jason Lader – recording
- Eric Lynn – recording
- Vlado Meller – mastering
- Gary Moon – recording
- Sean Oakley – recording
- Rick Rubin – production
- Mark Santangelo – mastering
- Joe Spix – art direction and design

== Charts ==
=== Weekly charts ===
Weekly sales chart performance for La Futura
Chart (2012)	Peak position
Austrian Albums (Ö3 Austria)	7
Belgian Albums (Ultratop Flanders)	28
Belgian Albums (Ultratop Wallonia)	9
Canadian Albums (Billboard)	7
Danish Albums (Hitlisten)	14
Dutch Albums (Album Top 100)	46
Finnish Albums (Suomen virallinen lista)	4
French Albums (SNEP)	13
German Albums (Offizielle Top 100)	5
Italian Albums (FIMI)	45
Norwegian Albums (VG-lista)	7
Russian Albums (Lenta)	7
Scottish Albums (Official Charts)	26
Spanish Albums (Promusicae)	62
Swedish Albums (Sverigetopplistan)	11
Swiss Albums (Schweizer Hitparade)	4
UK Albums (Official Charts)	29
US Billboard 200	6
US Top Rock Albums (Billboard)	5

=== Year-end charts ===
Annual sales chart performance for La Futura
Chart (2012)	Position
German Albums (Offizielle Top 100)	93
Russian Albums (Lenta)	7
Swiss Albums (Schweizer Hitparade)	90

== Certifications ==
Certifications for La Futura
Region	Certification	Certified units/sales
Germany (BVMI)	Gold	100,000^{‡}
^{‡} Sales+streaming figures based on certification alone.
