= Antenna (ZZ Top album) =

Studio album by ZZ Top
- Released: January 18, 1994
- Recorded: June–October 1993
- Genre: Blues rock
- Length: 50:51
- Label: RCA
- Producers: Billy Gibbons, Bill Ham

ZZ Top chronology
ZZ Top's Greatest Hits (1992)	Antenna (1994)	One Foot in the Blues (1994)

Singles from Antenna
- 1. "Pincushion" Released: 1994 (Note: Pincushion CD single: "Pincushion (Album Version)" (4:33) b/w "Pincushion (Edited Version)" (3:42) and "Cherry Red" (4:38); total duration: 12:53.); 2. "Breakaway" Released: 1994; 3. "PCH" Released: 1994; 4. "Fuzzbox Voodoo" Released: 1994

Professional ratings
Review scores
Source	Rating
AllMusic	3/5 stars
Rolling Stone	3.5/5 stars
The Rolling Stone Album Guide	3/5 stars
Sputnikmusic	4/5 stars

Antenna is the eleventh studio album by the American rock band ZZ Top, released in 1994. It was the band's first album to be released on the RCA label.

The single "Pincushion", reached number 1 on the Mainstream Rock Tracks chart in the US. The second single "Breakaway" featured a non-album B-side: "Mary's".

== Track listing ==
All tracks are written by Billy Gibbons, Dusty Hill, and Frank Beard, except where noted.

No.	Title	Writer(s)	Length
1.	"Pincushion"		4:33
2.	"Breakaway"	Gibbons	4:57
3.	"World of Swirl"	Gibbons	4:08
4.	"Fuzzbox Voodoo"		4:42
5.	"Girl in a T-Shirt"	Gibbons	4:10
6.	"Antenna Head"		4:42
7.	"PCH"		3:57
8.	"Cherry Red"	Gibbons	4:38
9.	"Cover Your Rig"		5:49
10.	"Lizard Life"		5:09
11.	"Deal Goin' Down"		4:06

European and Japanese versions' bonus track
No.	Title	Length
12.	"Everything"	3:54

== Personnel ==
- Billy Gibbons – lead guitar, lead and backing vocals
- Dusty Hill – bass, keyboards, backing vocals, lead vocals on "World of Swirl", "Antenna Head", and "Deal Goin' Down", rhythm guitar on “Breakaway”.
- Frank Beard – drums, percussion (dominated percussion in 2)

== Production ==
- Billy Gibbons – production
- Bill Ham – production
- Tom Harding – engineering
- Joe Hardy – engineering, mixing
- Bob Ludwig – mastering
- Bill Bernstein – photography
- Barbara LaBarge – photography
- Jim Bessman – text

== Charts ==
=== Album ===
Chart performance for Antenna
Chart (1994)	Peak position
Australian Albums (ARIA)	40
Austrian Albums (Ö3 Austria)	2
Dutch Albums (Album Top 100)	10
German Albums (Offizielle Top 100)	3
Hungarian Albums (MAHASZ)	25
New Zealand Albums (RMNZ)	13
Norwegian Albums (VG-lista)	4
Swedish Albums (Sverigetopplistan)	1
Swiss Albums (Schweizer Hitparade)	3
UK Albums (Official Charts)	3
US Billboard 200	14

=== Singles ===
Chart performance for singles from Antenna
Year	Single	Chart	Position
1994	Breakaway	Mainstream Rock Tracks	7
1994	Fuzzbox Voodoo	Mainstream Rock Tracks	30
1994	Girl in a T-shirt	Mainstream Rock Tracks	27
1994	Pincushion	Mainstream Rock Tracks	1

== Certifications ==
Region	Certification	Certified units/sales
Austria (IFPI Austria)	Gold	25,000^{*}
Canada (Music Canada)	Gold	50,000^{^}
Finland (Musiikkituottajat)	Gold	34,220
France (SNEP)	Gold	100,000^{*}
Germany (BVMI)	Gold	250,000^{^}
Norway (IFPI Norway)	Gold	25,000^{*}
Sweden (GLF)	Platinum	100,000^{^}
Switzerland (IFPI Switzerland)	Gold	25,000^{^}
United States (RIAA)	Platinum	1,000,000^{^}
Summaries
Europe (IFPI)	Platinum	1,000,000^{*}
^{*} Sales figures based on certification alone.^{^} Shipments figures based on certification alone.
