= El Loco =

Studio album by ZZ Top
- Released: July 15, 1981
- Genres: Blues rock; boogie rock
- Length: 36:49
- Label: Warner Bros.
- Producer: Bill Ham

ZZ Top chronology
Degüello (1979)	El Loco (1981)	Eliminator (1983)

Singles from El Loco
- 1. "Leila" Released: 1981; 2. "Tube Snake Boogie" Released: 1981

El Loco is the seventh studio album by the American rock band ZZ Top, released in 1981. It foreshadowed the band's extensive usage of synthesizers on Eliminator, Afterburner, and to a lesser extent, Recycler, by way of employing a synthesizer on a couple tracks, played by an uncredited Linden Hudson.

== Background ==
El Loco was produced by Bill Ham and recorded and originally mixed by Terry Manning. The biographer David Blayney explains in his book Sharp Dressed Men that the recording engineer Linden Hudson was involved as a pre-producer on this album. Hudson did not receive credit for engineering the tracks on "Groovy Little Hippie Pad" which were used on the final album mix. In 1987, most of the band's back catalog received a controversial "digitally enhanced" remix treatment for CD release; however, El Loco did not receive this remix treatment and the original mix of the album has been available on CD since 1987.

On June 3, 2013, Gibbons told Joe Bosso of MusicRadar.com that the album was "a really interesting turning point", explaining that the band had "befriended somebody who would become an influential associate, a guy named Linden Hudson. He was a gifted songwriter and had production skills that were leading the pack at times. He brought some elements to the forefront that helped reshape what ZZ Top were doing, starting in the studio and eventually to the live stage. [He] had no fear and was eager to experiment in ways that would frighten most bands. But we followed suit, and the synthesizers started to show up on record. Manufacturers were looking for ways to stimulate sales, and these instruments started appearing on the market. One of our favorite tracks was 'Groovy Little Hippie Pad'. Right at the very opening, there it is – the heavy sound of a synthesizer. For us, there was no turning back." English electronic band Orchestral Manoeuvres in the Dark were influential on this new direction.

Gibbons would cite seeing a Devo soundcheck in Houston as inspiring the synthesizer line on "Groovy Little Hippie Pad." However, Blayney described in his book how Hudson had composed and performed the synthesizer parts at the band's studio in Texas, a tape of which was taken to Memphis to be mixed into the final version of the song, without being credited. The double entendres on "Tube Snake Boogie" and "Pearl Necklace" are barely disguised, while much of the record plays as flat-out goofy party rock.

== Critical reception ==
Professional ratings
Review scores
Source	Rating
AllMusic	3/5 stars
Robert Christgau	B+
Tom Hull	B+
(The New) Rolling Stone Album Guide	3.5/5 stars

The Boston Globe wrote: "Instead of sticking to inventive boogie chops, producer Bill Ham has refined the material until only 'It's So Hard' with Billy Gibbon's scratchy guitar rises above the Ham's laundering process." The Globe and Mail opined that "the rhythm section of Dusty Hill and Frank Beard is doubtless the most pervasive around."

== Track listing ==
All tracks are written by Billy Gibbons, Dusty Hill, and Frank Beard.

Side one
No.	Title	Lead vocals	Length
1.	"Tube Snake Boogie"	Gibbons	3:02
2.	"I Wanna Drive You Home"	Gibbons	4:44
3.	"Ten Foot Pole"	Gibbons	4:19
4.	"Leila"	Gibbons	3:13
5.	"Don't Tease Me"	Gibbons; Hill	4:19

Side two
No.	Title	Lead vocals	Length
1.	"It's So Hard"	Gibbons	5:12
2.	"Pearl Necklace"	Gibbons	4:01
3.	"Groovy Little Hippie Pad"	Gibbons	2:40
4.	"Heaven, Hell or Houston"	Gibbons	2:31
5.	"Party on the Patio"	Hill	2:49

== Personnel ==
ZZ Top

- Billy Gibbons – guitar, vocals
- Dusty Hill – bass, keyboards, vocals
- Frank Beard – drums, percussion

Production

- Producer – Bill Ham
- Engineer – Terry Manning
- Pre-production engineer – Linden Hudson
- Mastering – Bob Ludwig
- Design – Bob Alford
- Photography – Bob Alford

== Charts ==
Chart (1981)	Peak position
Canada Top Albums/CDs (RPM)	19
German Albums (Offizielle Top 100)	52
Swedish Albums (Sverigetopplistan)	26
UK Albums (Official Charts)	88
US Billboard 200	17

== Certifications ==
Region	Certification	Certified units/sales
Canada (Music Canada)	Gold	50,000^{^}
United States (RIAA)	Gold	500,000^{^}
^{^} Shipments figures based on certification alone.
