= Pincushion (song) =

1994 single by ZZ Top

Single by ZZ Top

from the album Antenna
- B-side: "Cherry Red"
- Released: January 17, 1994
- Length: 4:33
- Label: RCA
- Songwriters: Billy Gibbons; Dusty Hill; Frank Beard
- Producer: Bill Ham

ZZ Top singles chronology
"Viva Las Vegas" (1992)	"Pincushion" (1994)	"Breakaway" (1994)

"Pincushion" is a song by American rock band ZZ Top, released in January 1994 by RCA Records as the first single from their 11th studio album, Antenna (1994). The song was written by the band and produced by Bill Ham. It spent four weeks atop the US Billboard Album Rock Tracks chart and became a top-20 hit in the United Kingdom, peaking at number 15 on the UK Singles Chart.

== Critical reception ==
Larry Flick from Billboard magazine wrote, "Having eradicated its synth stylings, ZZ Top churns out a sharp rocker that shows no trace of the band's poppier side. There is, however, plenty of studio sheen to further hone this cut's edge. Already scoring at album rock, it'll work its way toward crossover success." Pan-European magazine Music & Media commented, "Guitars buzz like an old prop plane. Ah, the Texan rockers are in the air again with the first single off their Antenna CD. Watch out for the emergency landing on your desk."

== Personnel ==
- Billy Gibbons – guitar, lead vocals
- Dusty Hill – bass, backing vocals
- Frank Beard – drums

== Charts ==
=== Weekly charts ===
Chart (1994)	Peak position
Canada Top Singles (RPM)	32
Europe (Eurochart Hot 100)	30
Europe (European Hit Radio)	20
Finland (Suomen virallinen lista)	5
New Zealand (Recorded Music NZ)	33
Sweden (Sverigetopplistan)	11
Switzerland (Schweizer Hitparade)	40
UK Singles (Official Charts)	15
UK Airplay (Music Week)	16
US Bubbling Under Hot 100 (Billboard)	24
US Mainstream Rock (Billboard)	1

=== Year-end charts ===
Chart (1994)	Position
US Album Rock Tracks (Billboard)	39
