= ZZ Top's First Album =

1970 studio album by ZZ Top

Studio album by ZZ Top
- Released: January 16th 1971
- Recorded: June–October 1970
- Studio: Robin Hood (Tyler, Texas)
- Genre: Blues rock
- Length: 35:16
- Label: London
- Producer: Bill Ham

ZZ Top chronology
ZZ Top's First Album (1971)	Rio Grande Mud (1972)

Singles from ZZ Top's First Album
- 1. "(Somebody Else Been) Shakin' Your Tree" Released: January 1971

ZZ Top's First Album is the debut studio album by American rock band ZZ Top, produced by Bill Ham and released in January 16th 1971 by London Records. Establishing ZZ Top's attitude and humor, the album incorporates styles such as blues, boogie, hard rock, and Southern rock influences. "(Somebody Else Been) Shakin' Your Tree" was the only single released from the album.

== Background, recording and release ==
The album was recorded at Robin Hood Studios in Tyler, Texas. ZZ Top frontman Billy Gibbons said:

We called the record ZZ Top's First Album because we wanted everyone to know that there would be more. We weren't certain if we'd get another chance in the studio, but we had high hopes.

The only single released from the album was "(Somebody Else Been) Shakin' Your Tree" (backed with "Neighbor, Neighbor") on London Records (release number 45-138). It failed to appear on the Billboard charts.

In 1987, the album was remixed for CD release. In 2013, the original vinyl mix was released on HD Tracks in high-resolution digital download formats. The original mix of the album was released on CD in June 2013 as part of the box set The Complete Studio Albums (1970–1990). In October 2017 a 180-gram vinyl edition of the album was released, using the original mix. In August 2024, the original stereo master tapes were used by Kevin Gray to cut lacquers for another 180-gram vinyl release.

== Reception ==
Professional ratings
Review scores
Source	Rating
AllMusic	3/5 stars
The Rolling Stone Album Guide	2/5 stars

AllMusic retrospectively gave it 3 stars, stating: "ZZ Top's First Album may not be perfectly polished, but it does establish their sound, attitude, and quirks."

== Track listing ==
Side one
No.	Title	Writer(s)	Length
1.	"(Somebody Else Been) Shaking Your Tree"	Billy Gibbons	2:32
2.	"Brown Sugar"	Gibbons	5:22
3.	"Squank"	Gibbons, Dusty Hill, Bill Ham	2:46
4.	"Goin' Down to Mexico"	Gibbons, Hill, Ham	3:26
5.	"Old Man"	Gibbons, Hill, Frank Beard	3:23

Side two
No.	Title	Writer(s)	Length
1.	"Neighbor, Neighbor"	Gibbons	2:18
2.	"Certified Blues"	Gibbons, Beard, Ham	3:25
3.	"Bedroom Thang"	Gibbons	4:37
4.	"Just Got Back from Baby's"	Gibbons, Ham	4:07
5.	"Backdoor Love Affair"	Gibbons, Ham	3:20
Total length:			35:16

== Personnel ==
=== ZZ Top ===
- Billy Gibbons – guitar, vocals
- Dusty Hill – bass, backing vocals, lead vocal on "Goin' Down to Mexico", co-lead vocal on "Squank"
- Frank Beard – drums (credited as "Rube Beard")

=== Production ===
- Bill Ham – producer
- Bill Narum – album design
- Frank Jaubert – photography
