= Viva Las Vegas (song) =

1964 single by Elvis Presley

Single by Elvis Presley
- B-side: "What'd I Say"
- Released: April 28, 1964
- Recorded: July 10, 1963
- Studio: Radio Recorders, Hollywood
- Genre: Rock and roll; pop
- Length: 2:24
- Label: RCA
- Songwriters: Doc Pomus, Mort Shuman

Elvis Presley singles chronology
"Kissin' Cousins" / "It Hurts Me" (1964)	"Viva Las Vegas" / "What'd I Say" (1964)	"Such a Night" / "Never Ending" (1964)

"Viva Las Vegas" is a 1964 song recorded by Elvis Presley written by Doc Pomus and Mort Shuman for his film of the same name, which along with the song was set for general release the year after. Although Elvis Presley never performed the song live, it has since become one of his most popular songs and often performed by others. The RIAA certified the single disc "Viva Las Vegas/What'd I Say" gold on March 27, 1992, having sold 500,000 copies in the United States.

== History ==
The song was recorded on July 10, 1963. Released as a single in 1964 with the B-side "What'd I Say" from the same film, "Viva Las Vegas" charted separately from its B-side, reaching No. 29 on the Billboard Hot 100 pop singles chart. The Elvis version of "What'd I Say" peaked at No. 21, the two sides having equivalent appeal in the marketplace. "Viva Las Vegas" reached No. 17 on the UK Singles Chart, improving to No. 15 after a reissue in 2007. The single reached No. 20 on the Record World chart in the US and No. 14 in Canada. The song was published by Elvis Presley Music, Inc.

In the years since, the song has become popular and often referenced in pop culture. In 2002, the city of Las Vegas requested Elvis Presley Enterprises, the company that handles Elvis-related music rights, to allow it to be the official song of the city. Negotiations stalled over the price. EPE had not controlled the copyright to the song since 1993, at which time it became the property of the families of the songwriters Doc Pomus and Mort Shuman.

== Use in other media ==
A cover of the song by country folk musician Shawn Colvin was featured during the end credits of the 1998 crime comedy film The Big Lebowski.

It was used in the movie Looney Tunes: Back in Action when bugs bunny is playing it on his guitar during the road trip to Las Vegas.

The song was featured in the 2010 video game Just Dance 2.

The song has been adopted as the victory theme for the National Hockey League (NHL)'s Vegas Golden Knights when they win games at T-Mobile Arena, and was played during their victory parade following the 2023 Stanley Cup Final.

During the trophy ceremony of Super Bowl LVIII at Allegiant Stadium, Travis Kelce, a tight end for the victorious Kansas City Chiefs, "belted out an impromptu, raggedy chorus" of the song.

A cover by Bastard Sons of Johnny Cash was featured in the 2018 cop comedy movie Show Dogs when the heroes arrive in Las Vegas.

== Dead Kennedys version ==
In 1980, San Francisco hardcore punk band Dead Kennedys recorded a sardonic version of the song for their debut album, Fresh Fruit for Rotting Vegetables. This version has altered lyrics, making references to cocaine and methamphetamine. It appeared on the album as the 14th and final track. The song was later featured during the end credits of the 1998 surreal comedy film Fear and Loathing in Las Vegas.

"Viva Las Vegas"

Song by Dead Kennedys

from the album Fresh Fruit for Rotting Vegetables
- Released: September 2, 1980
- Genre: Punk rock
- Length: 2:42
- Label: Cherry Red, Alternative Tentacles, Faulty Products, Manifesto
- Songwriters: Doc Pomus, Mort Shuman

== ZZ Top version ==
"Viva Las Vegas"

Single by ZZ Top

from the album Greatest Hits
- B-side: "2000 Blues"
- Released: 1992
- Length: 4:47
- Label: Warner Bros.
- Songwriters: Doc Pomus, Mort Shuman

ZZ Top singles chronology
"Burger Man" (1991)	"Viva Las Vegas" (1992)	"Pincushion" (1994)

ZZ Top recorded a version of "Viva Las Vegas" as one of two new tracks on their Greatest Hits album (1992). "Viva Las Vegas" was released as a single and reached the Top 10 in both the UK (No. 10) and Ireland (No. 8). This version appeared in a 1993 episode of Beavis and Butt-head.

== Bruce Springsteen version ==
In 1990, Bruce Springsteen recorded a version of the song that appeared on the UK release The Last Temptation of Elvis, a charity album from the New Musical Express featuring various artists performing songs made famous by Elvis Presley. The song was also considered for the soundtrack to the 1992 movie Honeymoon in Vegas, which again featured many Presley songs covered by famous artists. However, Springsteen's version was not included on the soundtrack album.

== Charts ==
=== Elvis Presley's original version ===
Chart (1964)	Peak position
Australia	4
Belgium	12
Canada (CHUM) Hit Parade	14
Denmark	3
Ireland (IRMA)	8
Italy	8
New Zealand (Lever Hit Parade)	4
Norway	6
Spain	16
Sweden	5
UK Singles (OCC)	17
US Billboard Hot 100	29
US Cash Box Top 100	16
US Record World Singles	20
West Germany (Official German Charts)	21

Chart (2007)	Peak position
UK Singles (OCC)	15

=== Certifications ===
Region	Certification	Certified units/sales
United Kingdom (BPI)	Silver	200,000^{‡}
United States (RIAA)	Gold	500,000^{^}
^{^} Shipments figures based on certification alone.^{‡} Sales+streaming figures based on certification alone.

=== ZZ Top cover ===
==== Weekly charts ====
Weekly chart performance for "Viva Las Vegas" by ZZ Top
Chart (1992)	Peak position
Australia (ARIA)	28
Austria (Ö3 Austria Top 40)	21
Finland (Suomen virallinen lista)	1
Germany (GfK)	34
Ireland (IRMA)	8
Netherlands (Single Top 100)	27
New Zealand (Recorded Music NZ)	17
Sweden (Sverigetopplistan)	7
Switzerland (Schweizer Hitparade)	20
UK Singles (Official Charts)	10
UK Airplay (Music Week)	5
US Mainstream Rock Airplay (Billboard)	16

==== Year-end charts ====
Year-end chart performance for "Viva Las Vegas" by ZZ Top
Chart (1992)	Position
Sweden (Topplistan)	39
UK Airplay (Music Week)	55
