= Doubleback =

1990 single by ZZ Top

Single by ZZ Top

from the album Recycler
- B-side: "Planet Of Women"
- Released: May 1990
- Genre: Rock; arena pop
- Length: 3:53
- Label: Warner Bros.
- Songwriters: Billy Gibbons; Dusty Hill; Frank Beard
- Producer: Bill Ham

ZZ Top singles chronology
"My Head's in Mississippi" (1990)	"Doubleback" (1990)	"Concrete and Steel" (1990)

"Doubleback" is a song by American rock band ZZ Top from their 1990 album Recycler. It was released as the album's lead single and was also included in the film Back to the Future Part III (1990)—the regular version of the song plays over the end credits of the film. The band had a cameo in the movie playing a country music version of the song along with some local musicians. This acoustic instrumental version appears on the Back to the Future Part III soundtrack album. The music video for "Doubleback" featured clips from the film and was included on its DVD release.

== Reception ==
"Doubleback" reached number one on the US Billboard Album Rock Tracks chart for five weeks. It was nominated for an MTV Video Music Award in 1990 for "Best Video from a Film".

== Personnel ==
- Billy Gibbons – guitar, lead vocals
- Dusty Hill – bass guitar, backing vocals
- Frank Beard – drums

== Charts ==
=== Weekly charts ===
Weekly chart performance for "Doubleback"
Chart (1990)	Peak position
Australia (ARIA)	41
Europe (Eurochart Hot 100)	38
New Zealand (Recorded Music NZ)	28
Sweden (Sverigetopplistan)	9
Switzerland (Schweizer Hitparade)	13
UK Singles (Official Charts)	29
US Billboard Hot 100	50
US Mainstream Rock (Billboard)	1
West Germany (GfK)	33

=== Year-end charts ===
Year-end chart performance for "Doubleback"
Chart (1990)	Position
Sweden (Topplistan)	54
US Mainstream Rock (Billboard)	12

== Release history ==
Release dates and formats for "Doubleback"
Region	Date	Format(s)	Label(s)	Ref.
United States	May 1990	7-inch vinyl; 12-inch vinyl; cassette	Warner Bros.	
Australia	June 4, 1990	7-inch vinyl; cassette	Warner Bros.	
Australia	June 18, 1990	CD	Warner Bros.	
United Kingdom	July 9, 1990	7-inch vinyl; 12-inch vinyl; CD; cassette	Warner Bros.	
Japan	July 25, 1990	Mini-CD	Warner Bros.	
