= Tube Snake Boogie =

Single by ZZ Top

from the album El Loco
- B-side: "Heaven, Hell or Houston" "La Grange" (France)
- Released: 1981
- Recorded: 1981
- Genre: Rock
- Length: 3:02
- Label: Warner Bros.
- Songwriters: Billy Gibbons; Dusty Hill; Frank Beard
- Producer: Bill Ham

ZZ Top singles chronology
"Pearl Necklace" (1981)	"Tube Snake Boogie" (1981)	"Gimme All Your Lovin'" (1983)

"Tube Snake Boogie" is a song from American rock band ZZ Top's 1981 album El Loco. It was released as a single the same year and reached No. 4 on the Billboard Mainstream Rock chart.

While the lyrics seem to imply sexual innuendo or double entendre, the liner notes for the band's 1992 Greatest Hits album added that "'tube snake' is [also] gnarly lingo for a surfboard, or 'boogie board.' Either way, it's good clean fun."

The song was produced by Bill Ham, and recorded and mixed by Terry Manning.

Record World said that "Frank Beard's jungle drums on the intro are ample warning that the energetic trio is ready to boogie" and noted the "virtuoso guitar work and gritty vocal."

== Charts ==
Chart (1981)	Peak position
U.S. Billboard Bubbling Under Hot 100 Singles	103
U.S. Billboard Mainstream Rock Tracks	4

== Personnel ==
- Billy Gibbons - guitar, lead vocals
- Dusty Hill - bass, backing vocals
- Frank Beard - drums, percussion
