= Pearl Necklace (song) =

Song by ZZ Top

from the album El Loco
- Released: 1981
- Recorded: 1979
- Genre: Rock
- Length: 4:01
- Label: Warner Bros.
- Songwriters: Billy Gibbons; Dusty Hill; Frank Beard
- Producer: Bill Ham

"Pearl Necklace" is a song by ZZ Top from their 1981 album El Loco. The song went to No. 28 on the Billboard Rock Tracks chart in 1981 but was never released as a single.

"Pearl Necklace" was produced by Bill Ham, and recorded and mixed by Terry Manning.

== Song information ==
The song contains double entendre lyrics which refer to a sexual act called a "pearl necklace".

== Charts ==
Chart (1981)	Peak position
U.S. Billboard Top Tracks	28

== Personnel ==
- Billy Gibbons – guitar, vocals
- Dusty Hill – bass
- Frank Beard – drums
