= ZZ Top =

American rock band

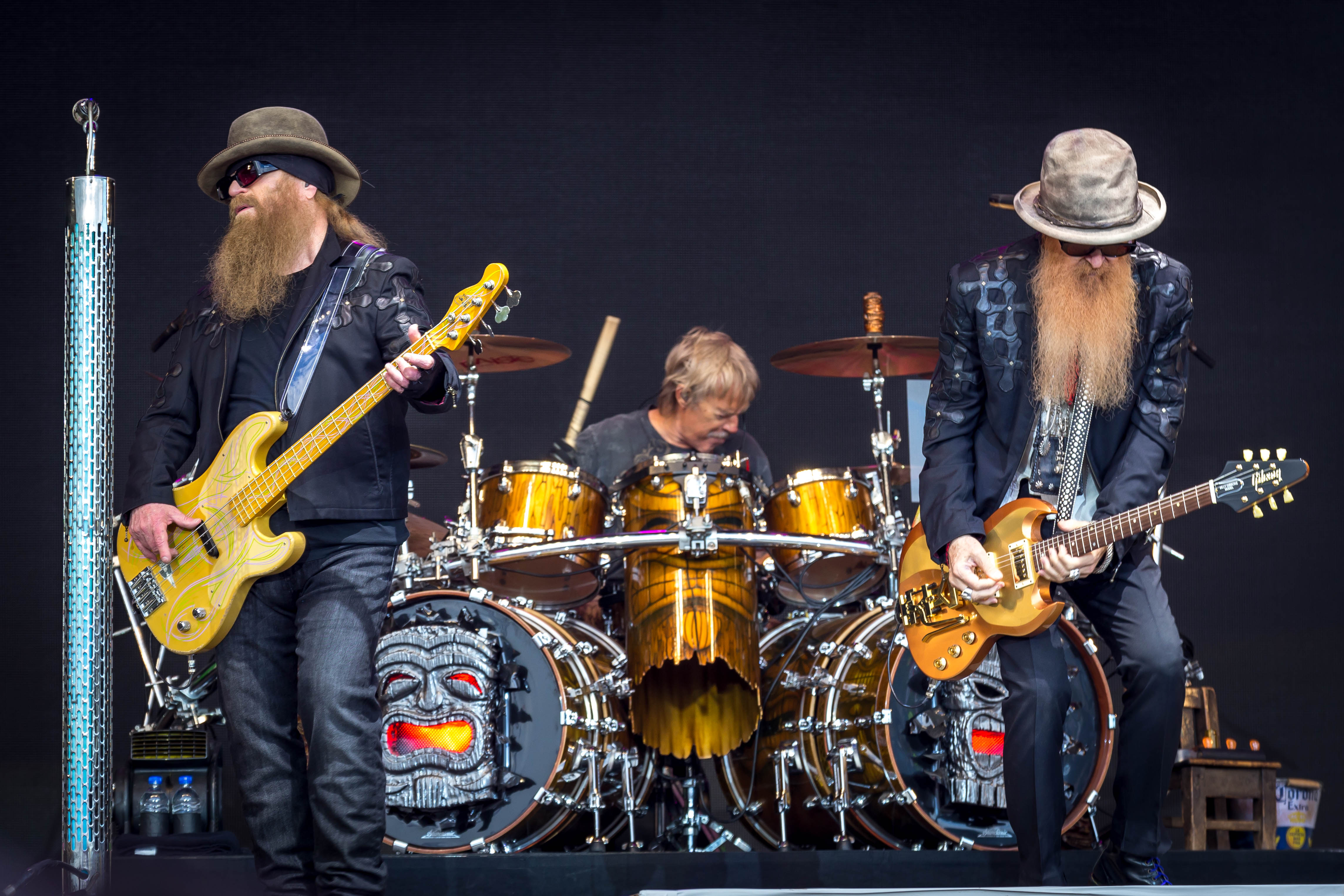
- ZZ Top's best-known lineup performing at 2016 Glastonbury Festival. From left: Dusty Hill, Frank Beard, Billy Gibbons

Background information
- Origin: Houston, Texas, U.S.
- Genres: Blues rock; hard rock; boogie rock; Southern rock
- Works: Discography
- Years active: 1969–present
- Labels: American; RCA; Warner Bros.; London
- Spinoff of: Moving Sidewalks; American Blues
- Members: Billy Gibbons; Elwood Francis; touring: Michael Monahan
- Past members: Lanier Greig; Dan Mitchell; Frank Beard; Billy Ethridge; Dusty Hill
- Website: zztop.com

ZZ Top (Note: /ˌziːziː ˈtɒp/ ZEE-zee TOP) is an American rock band formed in Houston, Texas, in 1969. For five decades, the band had consisted of vocalist-guitarist Billy Gibbons, drummer Frank Beard and bassist-vocalist Dusty Hill, until Hill's death in 2021 and Beard's death in 2026. ZZ Top developed a signature sound based on Gibbons' blues style and Hill and Beard's rhythm section. They are known for their live performances, sly and humorous lyrics, and the matching appearances of Gibbons and Hill, who wore sunglasses, hats, and long beards.

ZZ Top formed after Gibbons' band, Moving Sidewalks, disbanded in 1969. Within a year, they signed with London Records and released ZZ Top's First Album in 1971. Subsequent albums, including Tres Hombres (1973) and Fandango! (1975), and singles "La Grange" and "Tush", gained extensive radio airplay and have become staple tracks of classic rock radio. By the mid-1970s, ZZ Top had become renowned in North America for their live act, including the Worldwide Texas Tour (1976–77), which was a critical and commercial success. ZZ Top returned in 1979 with a new musical direction and image, with Gibbons and Hill wearing sunglasses and matching chest-length beards. With the album El Loco (1981), they began to experiment with synthesizers and drum machines. They established a more mainstream sound and rose to international stardom with Eliminator (1983) and Afterburner (1985), which integrated influences from new wave, punk, and dance-rock. The popularity of the albums' music videos, including for "Gimme All Your Lovin'", "Sharp Dressed Man", and "Legs", gave them mass exposure on MTV and made them prominent in 1980s pop culture. The Afterburner tour set records for the highest-attended and highest-grossing of 1986.

After the release of their 10th album, Recycler (1990), and its accompanying tour, the group's experimentation continued with mixed success on the albums Antenna (1994), Rhythmeen (1996), XXX (1999), and Mescalero (2003). They released La Futura (2012) and Goin' 50 (2019), a compilation album commemorating the band's 50th anniversary. In 2018, the band won the Guinness World Record for the longest-running active group with no lineup changes. After Hill's death in July 2021, he was replaced by their longtime guitar tech, Elwood Francis, in line with Hill's wishes. Beard died in 2026; drummer Michael Monahan has been filling in for him on tour since 2025.

ZZ Top has released 15 studio albums and sold an estimated 50 million records. They have won three MTV Video Music Awards, and in 2004, the members were inducted into the Rock and Roll Hall of Fame. In 2015, Rolling Stone ranked Gibbons the 32nd-greatest guitarist of all time. The band members have supported campaigns and charities including Childline, St. Jude Children's Research Hospital, and the Delta Blues Museum.

== History ==
=== Formation ===
Billy Gibbons had formed the band the Moving Sidewalks in Houston in 1966 with Dan Mitchell on drums, Tom Moore on keyboards, and Don Summers on bass. The group earned Gibbons local recognition, with their single "99th Floor" becoming a local hit. After opening for various popular groups such as the Doors, Jimi Hendrix, and the 13th Floor Elevators, Moving Sidewalks eventually released the album Flash (1969). By this point, both Moore and Summers had been drafted into the United States Army to fight in the Vietnam War, and Gibbons and Mitchell subsequently recruited bassist-keyboardist Lanier Greig, thus forming the first iteration of ZZ Top in June 1969. The name of the band was Gibbons' idea; the band had a small apartment covered with concert posters, and he noticed that many performers' names used initials. Gibbons particularly noticed B.B. King and Z.Z. Hill, and thought of combining the two into "ZZ King", but considered it too similar to the original name. He then figured that "king is at the top" which gave him the idea of naming the band "ZZ Top".

=== Early years (1969–1972) ===
ZZ Top was managed by Bill Ham, a Waxahachie, Texas native who had befriended Gibbons a year earlier. They released their first single, "Salt Lick", in 1969, and the B-side contained the song "Miller's Farm". Both songs credited Gibbons as the composer. Shortly after the recording of "Salt Lick", Greig was replaced by bassist Billy Ethridge, a bandmate of Stevie Ray Vaughan's, and Mitchell was replaced by Frank Beard of American Blues.

Due to lack of interest from the major American record companies, ZZ Top accepted a record deal from London Records, the American affiliate of the British Decca Records label. Unwilling to sign a recording contract, Ethridge quit the band and Dusty Hill, Frank Beard's American Blues bandmate, became his replacement in late 1969. At this moment, all three members of the band were 20 years old. After Hill moved from Dallas to Houston, ZZ Top signed with London in 1970. They performed their first concert together at a Knights of Columbus Hall in Beaumont, Texas, on February 10, 1970. The show was booked by KLVI radio personality Al Caldwell, who was also instrumental in broadcasting the band's first recordings.

In addition to assuming the role as the band's leader, Gibbons became the main lyricist and musical arranger. With the assistance of Ham and engineer Robin Hood Brians, ZZ Top's First Album (1971) was released. It featured "barrelhouse" rhythms, distorted guitars, double entendres, and innuendo. The music and songs reflected ZZ Top's blues influences. Following their debut album, the band released Rio Grande Mud (1972), which produced their first charting single, "Francine".

=== First decade of success and signature sound (1973–1982) ===
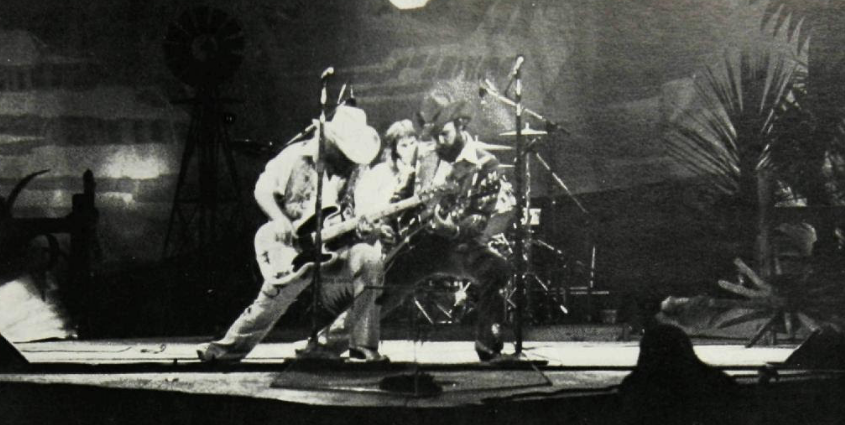
ZZ Top performing live in 1976

Hill and Gibbons in 1977

ZZ Top released Tres Hombres in 1973, which reached the number eight on the Billboard 200 albums chart by early 1974. The album's sound was the result of the propulsive support provided by Hill and Beard, and Gibbons' "growling" guitar tone. Stephen Thomas Erlewine wrote that the album "brought ZZ Top their first top-10 record, making them stars in the process". The album included the boogie-driven "La Grange" (written about the Chicken Ranch, a notorious brothel in La Grange, Texas, that also inspired the musical The Best Little Whorehouse in Texas). On the subsequent tour, the band performed sold-out concerts in the US. During this tour, ZZ Top recorded the live tracks that would fill one side of their 1975 album, Fandango!, which also contained one side of new studio songs. The album charted highly and its single "Tush" peaked at number 20 on the Billboard Hot 100.

ZZ Top began the Worldwide Texas Tour in May 1976 to support Fandango!, and the tour continued through 1977 with 98 shows over 18 months. Tejas, recorded during a break in the tour and released in November 1976, was the final ZZ Top album under their contract with London Records. It was not as successful or as positively received as their previous two efforts, but reached number 17 on the Billboard 200. The singles from Tejas, "It's Only Love" and "Arrested for Driving While Blind", both failed to crack the top 40 on the Billboard Hot 100.

In 1978, after almost seven years of touring and a string of successful albums, ZZ Top went on hiatus while Beard dealt with addiction problems. Gibbons traveled to Europe, Beard went to Jamaica, and Hill went to Mexico. Hill also spent three months working at DFW Airport, saying he wanted to "feel normal" and "ground himself" after years spent performing. In 1979, ZZ Top returned to record a new album. Gibbons and Hill were now sporting chest-length beards. ZZ Top signed with Warner Bros. Records and released the album Degüello in late 1979.

While Degüello went platinum, it only reached number 24 on the Billboard chart. The album produced two popular singles: "I Thank You", a cover of the David Porter/Isaac Hayes composition originally recorded by Sam & Dave, and the band original "Cheap Sunglasses". The band remained a popular concert attraction and toured in support of Degüello. In April 1980, ZZ Top made their first appearances in Europe, performing for the German music television show Rockpalast (later included on the 2009 DVD Double Down Live: 1980 & 2008) and the BBC show The Old Grey Whistle Test. The band shared the BBC's studio with English electronic group Orchestral Manoeuvres in the Dark (OMD), whom Gibbons felt "were great". Inspired by OMD, ZZ Top introduced a jerky dancing style to their live show and began to experiment with synthesizers, which featured prominently on the October 1981 album El Loco. The album peaked at number 17 on the Billboard chart, and featured the singles "Tube Snake Boogie", "Pearl Necklace", and "Leila". Their albums from this period showed a more modern sound.

=== Eliminator (1983–1984) ===
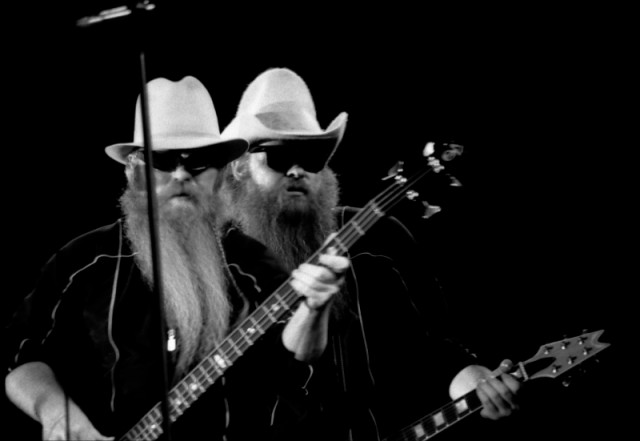
Hill and Gibbons in 1983

ZZ Top in 1983 (L-R: Hill, Beard, Gibbons)

Gibbons pushed ZZ Top in a more modern direction for Eliminator, released in March 1983. It featured two top-40 singles ("Gimme All Your Lovin'" and "Legs"), and two additional Top Rock hits ("Got Me Under Pressure" and "Sharp Dressed Man"), with the extended dance mix of "Legs" peaking at number 13 on the Club Play Singles chart. The album became a critical and commercial success, selling more than 10 million copies and reaching number 9 in the U.S. Billboard pop charts. It is the only ZZ Top album to be certified diamond.

Several music videos from the album were in regular rotation on MTV, attracting many new fans. The band won their first MTV Video Music Awards in the categories of Best Group Video for "Legs", and Best Direction for "Sharp Dressed Man". The music videos were included in their Greatest Hits video, which was later released on DVD and quickly went multiplatinum.

Eliminator retained Gibbons's signature guitar style, while adding elements of new wave music; the electronic band Depeche Mode was cited as an influence. To compose the songs, Gibbons worked closely with live-in engineer Linden Hudson at the band's rehearsal studio in Texas, setting a faster tempo with drum machines and synthesizers. The main recording sessions were again supervised in Memphis by Terry Manning, who collaborated with Gibbons to replace many of the contributions from Hill and Beard. Jimi Jamison joined Manning to provide backing vocals with Billy Gibbons even referring to him as the fourth member of the band. Jamison also provided backing vocals in the following albums Afterburner and Recycler.

Stage manager David Blayney described how Hudson co-wrote much of the material on the album without receiving credit. The band recorded Hudson's song "Thug" without permission, finally paying him $600,000 in 1986 after he proved in court he held the copyright. The band had previously used other people's work without credit; for instance, in 1972 ZZ Top claimed sole writing credit for the hit song "Francine" from the album Rio Grande Mud, cutting out two co-writers, Steve Perron and Kenny Cordray. Hudson's extensive contributions to the song "Groovy Little Hippie Pad" went uncredited in 1981 for the album El Loco.

=== Afterburner and Recycler (1985–1991) ===
Despite selling fewer copies than Eliminator, Afterburner (1985) became ZZ Top's highest-charting album (number four on the U.S. Billboard chart), with sales of five million copies. All of the singles from Afterburner were top-40 hits, with "Sleeping Bag" and "Stages" topping the Mainstream Rock chart. The music video for "Velcro Fly", their final top-40 hit on the Billboard Hot 100, was choreographed by future pop singer Paula Abdul. In 1987, ZZ Top released The Six Pack, a collection of their first five albums plus El Loco. The albums were remixed with new drum and guitar effects for a more "contemporary" sound similar to Eliminator.

Recycler, released in 1990, was ZZ Top's final studio album with Warner Records and the last of a distinct sonic trilogy in their catalogue, marking a return towards a simpler guitar-driven blues sound with less synthesizer and pop bounce than their previous two albums. This move did not entirely suit the fan base that Eliminator and Afterburner had built up, and while Recycler did achieve platinum status, it never matched the sales of those albums. However, the single "My Head's in Mississippi" reached number one on the Billboard Album Rock Tracks chart that year.

=== Return to guitar-driven sound (1992–2003) ===
In 1992, Warner released ZZ Top's Greatest Hits, along with a new Rolling Stones-style cut, "Gun Love", and an Elvis-inflected video, "Viva Las Vegas". In 1993, ZZ Top inducted a major influence, Cream, into the Rock and Roll Hall of Fame.

In 1994, the band signed a $35 million deal with RCA Records, releasing the million-selling Antenna. Subsequent RCA albums, Rhythmeen (1996) and 1999's XXX (the second album to feature live tracks) sold well, but did not reach the levels enjoyed previously. In 2003, ZZ Top released a final RCA album, Mescalero, an album thick with harsh Gibbons guitar and featuring a hidden track—a cover version of "As Time Goes By." RCA impresario Clive Davis wanted to do a collaboration record (in the mode of Carlos Santana's successful Supernatural) for this album. In an interview in Goldmine, Davis stated that artists Pink, Dave Matthews, and Wilco were among the artists slated for the project. ZZ Top performed "Tush" and "Legs" as part of the Super Bowl XXXI halftime show in 1997.

A comprehensive four-CD collection of recordings from the London and Warner Bros. years, Chrome, Smoke & BBQ, was released in 2003. It featured the band's first single (A- and B-side) and several rare B-side tracks, as well as a radio promotion from 1979, a live track, and several extended dance-mix versions of their biggest MTV hits. Three tracks from Billy Gibbons' pre-ZZ band, the Moving Sidewalks, were also included.

=== Critical acclaim and retrospective releases (2004–2011) ===
In 2004, ZZ Top was inducted into the Rock and Roll Hall of Fame. Keith Richards of the Rolling Stones gave the induction speech. ZZ Top gave a brief performance, playing "La Grange" and "Tush".

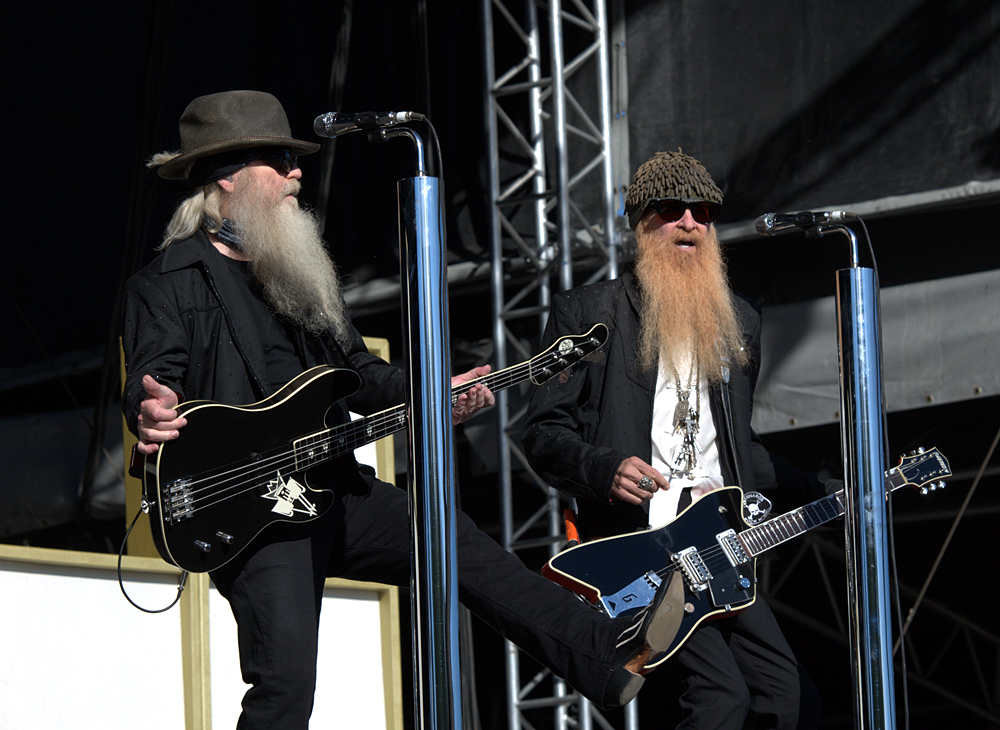
Hill and Gibbons performing at Puistoblues in Järvenpää, Finland, on July 4, 2010

In 2006, Tres Hombres and Fandango! received releases of expanded and remastered versions, which used the original mixes free from echo and drum machines, and included additional bonus live tracks.

The Eliminator Collector's Edition CD/DVD, celebrating the 25th anniversary of the band's iconic RIAA Diamond Certified album, was released September 10, 2008. The release includes seven bonus tracks and a bonus DVD, including four television performances from The Tube in November 1983.

The band performed at the 2009 Houston Livestock Show and Rodeo on the final night on March 22, 2009. In July, the band appeared on VH1's Storytellers, in celebration of their four decades as recording artists.

=== La Futura (2012–2020) ===
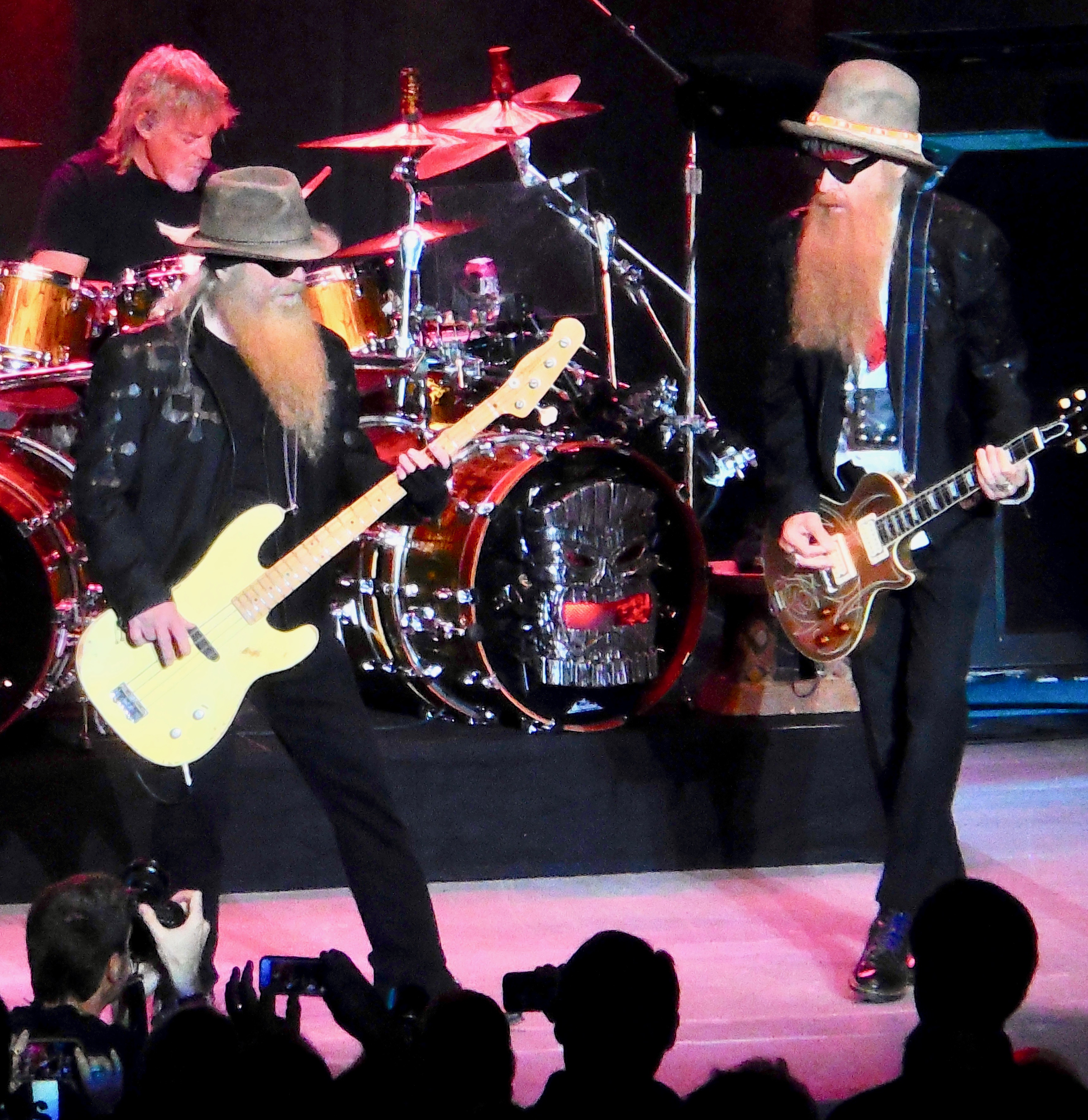
ZZ Top performing at the Greek Theatre in Los Angeles, August 2014.

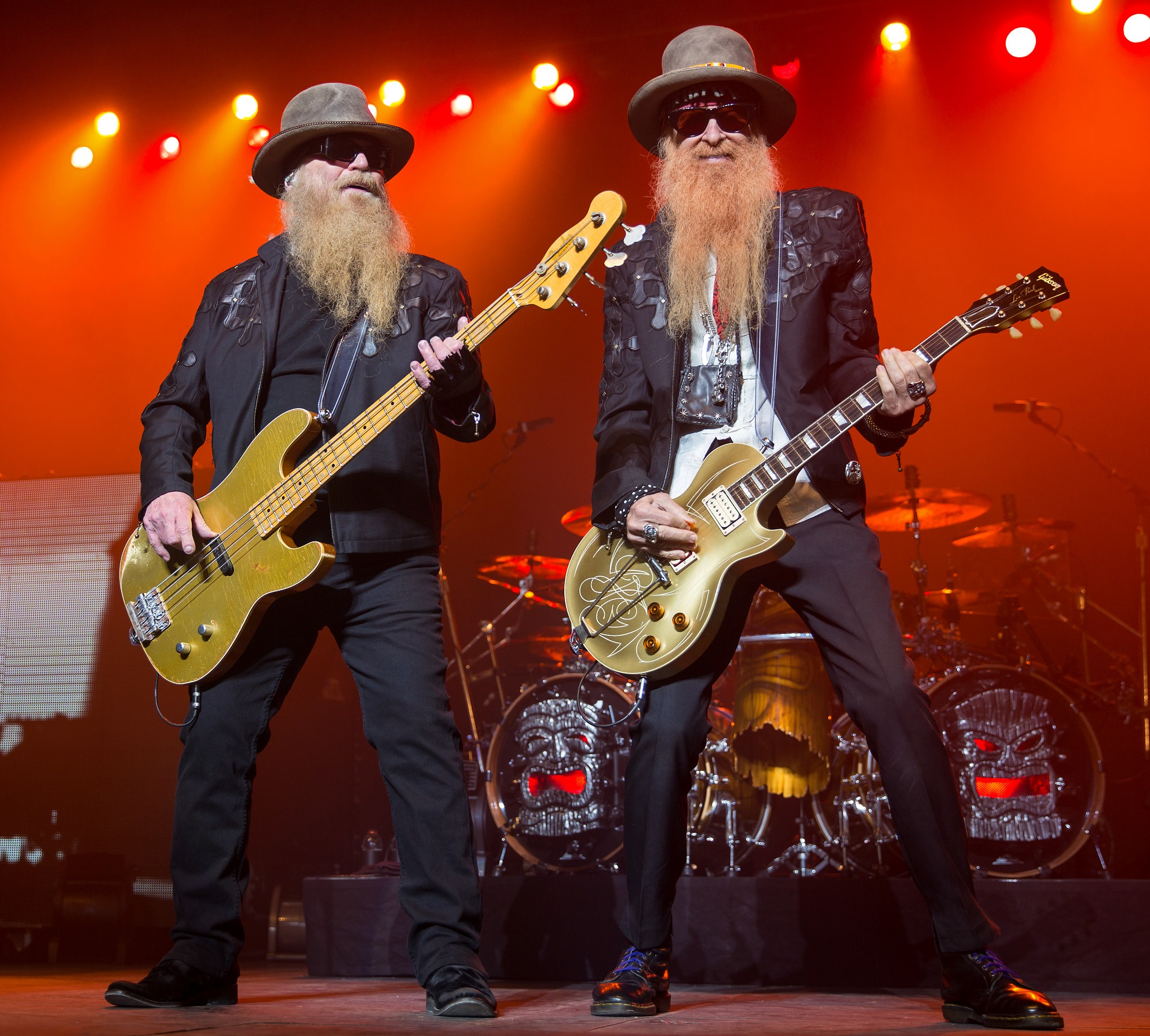
ZZ Top performing at the Majestic Theatre in San Antonio in 2015

ZZ Top released La Futura, produced by Rick Rubin, on September 11, 2012. The first single, "I Gotsta Get Paid", debuted in an advertising campaign for Jeremiah Weed Whiskey and appears on the soundtrack of the film Battleship. The song itself is an interpretation of "25 Lighters" by Texan hip hop DJ DMD and rappers Lil' Keke and Fat Pat. The first four songs from La Futura debuted on June 5, 2012, on an EP called Texicali. DJ Screw was a major influence on the album as well, particularly because Gibbons and Screw both worked with engineer G. L. Moon during the late 1990s.

On March 3, 2015, ZZ Top began a North American tour in Red Bank, New Jersey, at the Count Basie Theatre. After rescheduled dates and additions, the tour ended in Highland Park, Illinois, at the Ravinia Festival on August 27, with the opening act Blackberry Smoke. Jeff Beck joined ZZ Top for seven concerts.

On September 9, 2016, ZZ Top released Tonite at Midnight: Live Greatest Hits from Around the World. In 2017, they began the 2017 Tonnage Tour, but canceled the last few dates due to Hill's declining health. In 2018, ZZ Top won the Guinness world record for the longest-running active group with no lineup changes. In October, they announced a six-day Las Vegas run of shows to be held at the Venetian, starting from April 20, 2019. Gibbons told Las Vegas Review-Journal in April 2020 that ZZ Top had been preparing another album. On June 21, 2020, Gibbons stated interest in having Beck appear.

=== Deaths of Hill and Beard and upcoming album (2021–present) ===
In July 2021, Hill was forced to leave a tour after a hip injury. ZZ Top performed without him at the Village Commons in New Lenox, Illinois, with Francis on bass. Five days later, on July 28, ZZ Top announced that Hill had died at his home in Houston at the age of 72. His wife later reported that he had suffered from chronic bursitis. At Hill's request, ZZ Top continued with Francis on bass. In August 2021, Gibbons confirmed that Hill had recorded bass and vocals for the band's upcoming sixteenth studio album prior to his death.

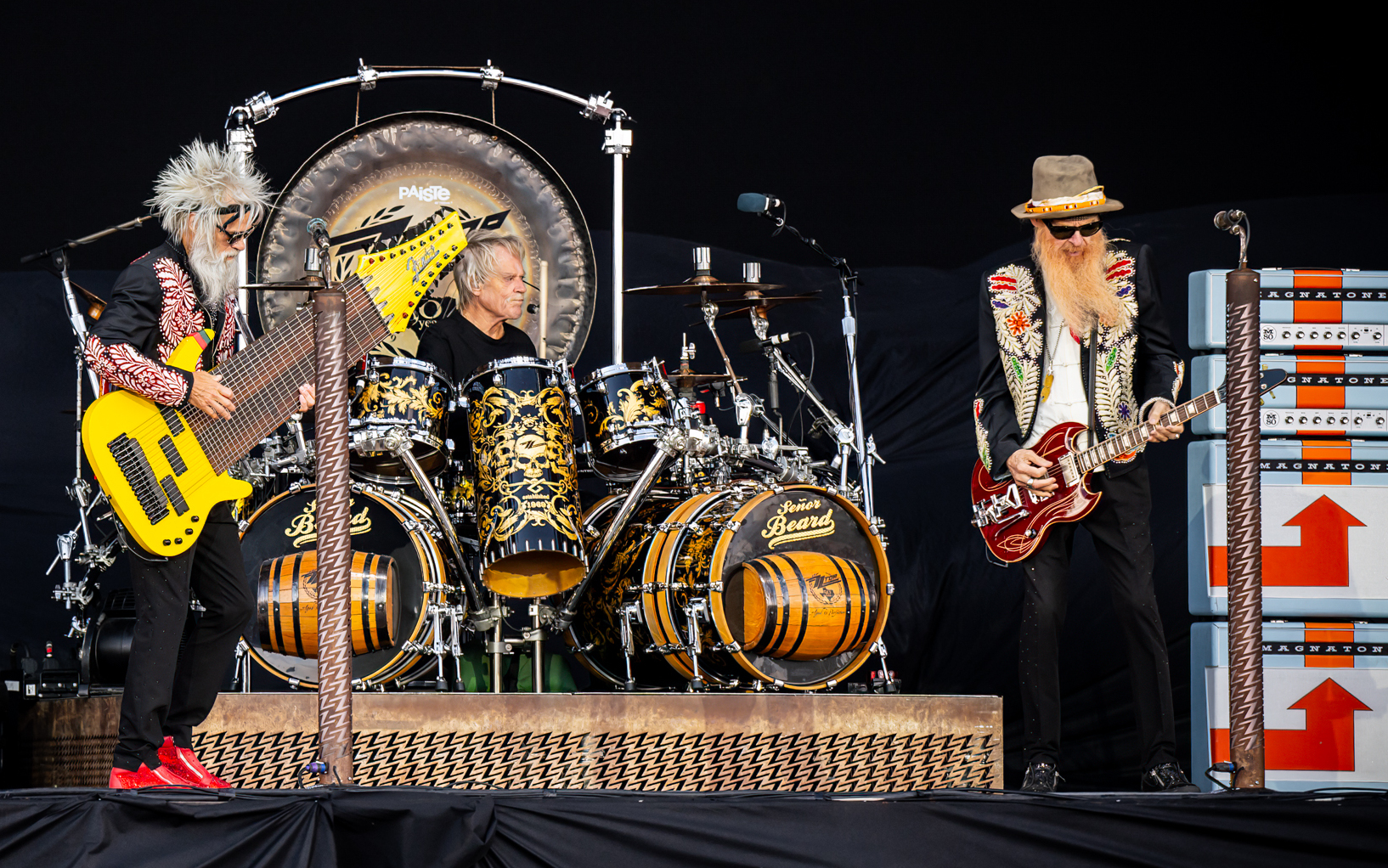
ZZ Top performing in Oslo in 2024.

New ZZ Top members Michael Monahan (left) and Elwood Francis (right) performing in Malmö, Sweden in 2026.

On July 22, 2022, ZZ Top released Raw, the soundtrack for the band's 2019 documentary That Little Ol' Band from Texas, via Shelter Records/BMG. It was one of their final live albums with Hill. On July 21, 2023, ZZ Top began a tour with Lynyrd Skynyrd, the Sharp Dressed Simple Man Tour, in West Palm Beach, which concluded on September 17 in Camden. A second leg of the tour began in March 2024 in Savannah, Georgia, and was due to end on September 22 in Ridgefield, Washington. On March 2, 2024, in Key West, ZZ Top embarked on the Elevation tour through to November 24, 2024, in Lubbock. The Elevation tour resumed on March 2, 2025, in New Orleans and ended on November 22, 2025, in Biloxi. In March 2025, Beard temporarily left the tour due to illness, and was replaced by ZZ Top's longtime drum technician, John Douglas. Beard later resumed the tour and his final public performance with the band was also the final date of the tour. On August 17, 2026, Beard died at the age of 77, leaving Gibbons as the only surviving member of ZZ Top's classic lineup. Gibbons announced on the following day that the band would continue per Beard's wishes, similar to Hill's request in 2021. ZZ Top played their first show after Beard's death with touring drummer Michael Monahan (who had already been filling in for Beard before his death) at Austin's ACL Live, which took place at the Moody Theater, on August 22, 2026.

== Other appearances ==
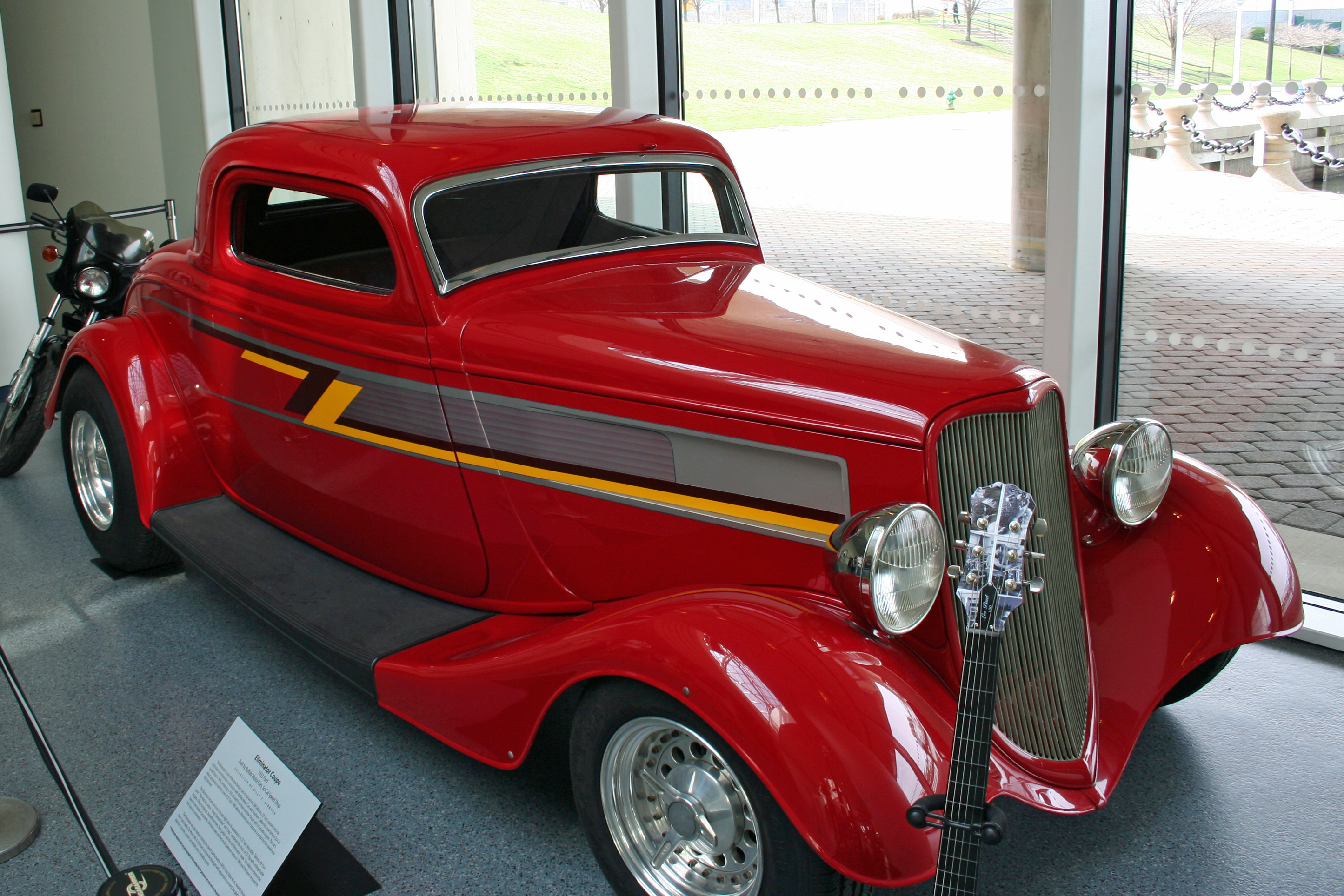
ZZ Top Eliminator at the Rock and Roll Hall of Fame, 2010

ZZ Top appeared in a cameo in Back to the Future Part III as an Old West band, playing an acoustic version of their song "Doubleback" with a large fiddle band.

ZZ Top played Super Bowl XXXI in 1997, along with the Blues Brothers and James Brown. They also performed at the 2008 Orange Bowl game in Miami, as well as the Auto Club 500 NASCAR event at the Auto Club Speedway in Fontana, California. On June 23, 2008, the band celebrated the release of their first live concert DVD titled Live from Texas with the world premiere, a special appearance, and charity auction at the Hard Rock Cafe in Houston. The DVD was officially released on June 24, 2008. The featured performance was culled from a concert filmed at the Nokia Theater in Grand Prairie, Texas, on November 1, 2007.

On January 22, 2010, Billy Gibbons, Will Ferrell, and Beck joined a band playing Lynyrd Skynyrd's "Free Bird" on Conan O'Brien's last Tonight Show appearance. O'Brien joined in on guitar. In June 2011, various media sources reported that the new song "Flyin' High" would debut in space. Astronaut and friend of ZZ Top Michael Fossum was given the released single to listen to on his trip to the International Space Station. On June 4, 2014, ZZ Top opened the CMT Awards ceremony, performing "La Grange" with Luke Bryan and Florida Georgia Line.

== Musical style ==
The Guardian described ZZ Top as "part traditional, part contrary, and part of the deep seam of Texas weirdness that stretched from the 13th Floor Elevators through to the Butthole Surfers". Texas Monthly described their music as "loud, macho, greasy, and distorted", with "unrepentant misogynistic references". In the early 1980s, ZZ Top embraced electronic instruments, drawing inspiration from British acts such as Orchestral Manoeuvres in the Dark (OMD) and Depeche Mode; the band also derived their onstage dance moves from those of OMD. Hill and Gibbons worked as a kind of double act, looking similar and employing simple stage choreography that Hill described as "low-energy, high-impact".

ZZ Top's music has been classified as blues rock, hard rock, boogie rock, Southern rock, blues, and Texas blues.

== Drug use ==
Beard struggled with addiction in the 1970s, claiming to have spent "every bit" of his money earned from ZZ Top's tours on drugs. Beard explains that he had different reasons for taking different drugs, saying "the pills thing came about just from the workload. And the heroin thing came about because I just liked it. I mean, you ever done heroin? It's great. It's a fucking vacation for the mind, and I liked it. I liked it a lot." Beard entered rehabilitation in the 1980s and was sober as of 2020.

Hill would "[occasionally] partake" in marijuana until one occasion in a hotel in Amsterdam, when Hill was smoking marijuana with guitar tech (and eventual replacement) Elwood Francis, who noticed that a metal bar was embedded into the window frame of the hotel room. Francis, seeing an opportunity for a prank, jumped out the window and (unbeknownst to Hill) grabbed onto the metal bar, making it appear that he had committed suicide. Hill apparently never smoked marijuana again after the incident.

== Band members ==
Current personnel

- Billy Gibbons – vocals, guitar (1969–present)
- Elwood Francis – bass, vocals, keyboards (2021–present; touring 2021)
- Michael Monahan – drums, percussion (touring; 2025–present)

Former

- Dan Mitchell – drums (1969)
- Lanier Greig – bass, keyboards (1969; died 2013)
- Frank Beard – drums, percussion (1969–2026; his death)
- Billy Ethridge – bass (1969–1970)
- Dusty Hill – bass, vocals, keyboards (1970–2021; his death)
- John Douglas – drums, percussion (2002, 2025; touring substitute for Frank Beard)

Timeline

== Discography ==
Studio albums

- ZZ Top's First Album (1971)
- Rio Grande Mud (1972)
- Tres Hombres (1973)
- Fandango! (1975)
- Tejas (1976)
- Degüello (1979)
- El Loco (1981)
- Eliminator (1983)
- Afterburner (1985)
- Recycler (1990)
- Antenna (1994)
- Rhythmeen (1996)
- XXX (1999)
- Mescalero (2003)
- La Futura (2012)

== Filmography ==
In addition to recording and performing concerts, ZZ Top has also been involved with films and television. In the eighth episode "Sweet Dreams" in the third season of the American television medical drama St. Elsewhere, Luther Hawkins's (Eric Laneuville) dream sequence was a parody of the music video "Legs" with the group while taking a brief nap in a janitor's closet; In 1990, the group appeared as the "Band At the Party" in the film Back to the Future Part III and played the "Three Men in a Tub" in the movie Mother Goose Rock 'n' Rhyme. ZZ Top made further appearances, including the "Gumby with a Pokey" episode of Two and a Half Men in 2010 and the "Hank Gets Dusted" episode of King of the Hill in 2007. The band also guest hosted an episode of WWE Raw. Billy Gibbons had a recurring role as the father of Angela Montenegro in the television show Bones; though the character is never named, it is strongly implied that Gibbons is playing himself. Their song "Sharp Dressed Man" was one of the theme songs used for the television show Duck Dynasty, and on the series finale of the show they appeared with Si Robertson as a vocalist to perform the song on stage during Robertson's retirement party. Black Dahlia Films, led by Jamie Burton Chamberlin, of Seattle and Los Angeles, has contributed documentaries and back line screen work (the footage on back screens during live shows) and has become an integral part of the band's film-making.

In November 2020, it was announced that the 2019 documentary That Little Ol' Band from Texas was nominated for the Grammy Award for Best Music Film with the award ceremony scheduled for March 2021.

== Awards and achievements ==
ZZ Top's music videos won multiple VMA awards during the 1980s, topping the categories of Best Group Video, Best Direction, and Best Art Direction for "Legs", "Sharp Dressed Man" and "Rough Boy", respectively. Among high honors for ZZ Top have been induction into Hollywood's RockWalk in 1994, the Texas House of Representatives naming them "Official Heroes for the State of Texas", a declaration of "ZZ Top Day" in Texas by then-governor Ann Richards on May 4, 1991, and induction into the Rock and Roll Hall of Fame in 2004. They were also given commemorative rings by actor Billy Bob Thornton from the VH1 Rock Honors in 2007.

ZZ Top has also achieved several chart and album sales feats, including six number-one singles on the Mainstream Rock chart. From the RIAA, ZZ Top has earned four gold, three platinum and two multiple-platinum album certifications, and one diamond album.

== See also ==
- List of artists who reached number one on the U.S. Mainstream Rock chart

== Bibliography ==
- Thomas, David (1985). Elimination – The ZZ Top Story. London: Omnibus Press. ISBN 0711907188.
