= My Head's in Mississippi =

"My Head's In Mississippi"

Single by ZZ Top

from the album Recycler
- B-side: "A Fool for Your Stockings"
- Released: 1990
- Recorded: 1989
- Genre: Blues rock
- Length: 4:17
- Label: Warner Bros.
- Songwriters: Billy Gibbons; Dusty Hill; Frank Beard
- Producer: Bill Ham

ZZ Top singles chronology
"Concrete and Steel" (1990)	"My Head's In Mississippi" (1990)	"Give It Up" (1990)

Music video
- "My Head's in Mississippi" on YouTube

"My Head's In Mississippi" is a song by ZZ Top from their album Recycler. The song was produced by band manager Bill Ham, and recorded and mixed by Terry Manning. In December 1990, the song reached number one on the Billboard Album Rock Tracks chart and number 166 in Australia.

== Composition ==
In 2015, Gibbons said of the song "My buddy Walter Baldwin spoke in the most poetic way. Every sentence was a visual awakening. His dad was the editor of the Houston Post. We grew up in a neighborhood where the last thing you would say is, 'These teenagers know what blues is.' But our appreciation dragged us in. Years later, we were sitting in a tavern in Memphis called Sleep Out Louie's — you could see the Mississippi River. Walter said, 'We didn't grow up pickin' cotton. We weren't field hands in Mississippi. But my head's there.' Our platform, in ZZ Top, was we'd be the Salvador Dalí of the Delta. It was a surrealist take. This song was not a big radio hit. But we still play it live, even if it's just the opening bit."

In 2008, Gibbons stated, "'My Head’s in Mississippi,' which was one of the first completed tracks on the album, is a great example of how we mixed the new with the old. Initially, it was a straight-ahead boogie-woogie. Then Frank stepped in and threw in those highly gated electronic drum fills, which modernized the track."

This track showcases the renewed blues influence on Recycler. Its style has been described as "guitar-driven electric boogie blues". The song was very popular with ZZ Top fans and topped the Billboard Album Rock Tracks chart, though none of the singles made it to the Top 40.

== Track listing ==
1. "My Head's In Mississippi"
2. "A Fool For Your Stockings"

== Album appearances ==
In addition to Recycler, "My Head's in Mississippi" appears on the following compilations:

- One Foot in the Blues
- Greatest Hits
- Rancho Texicano
- Chrome, Smoke & BBQ

== Personnel ==
- Billy Gibbons – guitar, vocals
- Dusty Hill – bass
- Frank Beard – drums

== Charts ==
Chart (1990–1991)	Peak position
Australia (ARIA)	166
UK Airplay (Music Week)	46
US Album Rock Tracks (Billboard)	1
