= Got Me Under Pressure =

1985 single by Dire Straits

Song by ZZ Top

from the album Eliminator
- Released: 1983
- Recorded: 1982
- Genre: Hard rock
- Length: 4:00
- Label: Warner Bros.
- Songwriters: Billy Gibbons; Linden Hudson
- Producer: Bill Ham

Audio video
- "Got Me Under Pressure" on YouTube

"Got Me Under Pressure" is a song by ZZ Top from their 1983 album Eliminator.

== Overview ==
The song was produced by band manager Bill Ham, and recorded and mixed by Terry Manning. David Blayney (ZZ Top's stage manager of 15 years), in his book Sharp Dressed Men, described how the song was pre-produced: Billy Gibbons and Linden Hudson (Houston engineer and songwriter) wrote the whole song and created a recorded demo all in one afternoon without either bassist Dusty Hill or drummer Frank Beard's knowledge. Linden created the bass on a synthesizer, created drums on a drum machine and helped Gibbons write the lyrics; Gibbons performed the guitars and vocals. In live performances of the song, Gibbons and Hill exchanged vocals with each alternate phrase.

== Album appearances ==
Besides Eliminator, "Got Me Under Pressure" also appears on the following compilations.

- Rancho Texicano
- Chrome, Smoke & BBQ
- Greatest Hits
- ZZ Top Summer Holiday (EP)

== Charts ==
Chart (1983)	Peak position
U.S. Billboard Mainstream Rock Tracks	18

== Uses in other media ==
In 2008, it was used in a TV commercial for Pennzoil.

== Personnel ==
- Billy Gibbons – guitar, vocals
- Linden Hudson – engineer, keyboard bass, synthesizer, synthesizer programming, drum machine
- Terry Manning – mixing, recording
- Bill Ham – producer

== Bibliography ==
- Frost, Deborah (1985). ZZ Top : bad and worldwide. photographs by Bob Alford. New York: Collier Books. ISBN 0020029500.
- Sinclair, David (1986). The story of ZZ Top : Tres Hombres. London: Virgin. ISBN 0-86369-167-6.
