= Recycler (album) =

Studio album by ZZ Top
- Released: October 16, 1990
- Recorded: May 1989 – July 1990
- Studio: Memphis Sound Productions (Memphis, Tennessee)
- Genre: Blues
- Length: 39:49
- Label: Warner Bros.
- Producer: Bill Ham

ZZ Top chronology
The Six Pack (1987)	Recycler (1990)	Greatest Hits (1992)

Singles from Recycler
- 1. "Doubleback" Released: May 1990; 2. "Concrete and Steel" Released: 1990; 3. "My Head's in Mississippi" Released: 1990; 4. "Give It Up" Released: November 1990; 5. "Burger Man" Released: 1991

Recycler is the tenth studio album by the American rock band ZZ Top, released in October 1990. It was their last album to utilize the synth-driven production style, which began on Eliminator and marked a return to the band's blues roots.

The band had a cameo in the 1990 movie Back to the Future Part III playing an "old west" version of "Doubleback" along with some local musicians. (The regular version of the song plays over the credits.) The music video for "Doubleback" also had clips from the movie and was included on the DVD. There were five hit singles from the album: "Doubleback" (No. 1 on the Album Rock Tracks for five weeks), "Concrete and Steel" (No. 1 on the Album Rock Tracks for four weeks), "Burger Man", "Give It Up", and "My Head's in Mississippi" (No. 1 on the Album Rock Tracks for six weeks).

Music videos were also made for "My Head's in Mississippi", "Burger Man" and "Give It Up".

In the UK, it was the band's third album to be certified by the British Phonographic Industry attaining Silver (60,000 units) in 1990.

== Production and recording ==
In a 2008 interview, Billy Gibbons stated, "Recycler was interesting to make, because initially we planned to follow the lineage established in Eliminator and Afterburner. We had written a couple of highly structured pop tunes in our studio in Houston. Then we went out to Los Angeles for a couple of months and got into the whole sequencer, everything-in-its-place thing. But when we arrived in Memphis to finish the record, we slid into a different mode. While we were waiting for all of our high-tech gear to arrive, we set up in a circle and started playing and jamming as a band. The sound, even though it was rougher and looser, felt right in every way. The results of some of those sessions can be heard on cuts like '2000 Blues' and 'My Head’s in Mississippi.' Both are reminiscent of our earlier music, which is why we call Recycler our Tres Hombres/Eliminator album."

He continued, "We didn’t abandon the ground we covered on Eliminator and Afterburner—you can still hear the sequencers and synthesizers—but they’re much more unobtrusive. We allowed some of the rougher elements of the band to come shining through. 'My Head’s in Mississippi,' which was one of the first completed tracks on the album, is a great example of how we mixed the new with the old. Initially, it was a straight-ahead boogie-woogie. Then Frank stepped in and threw in those highly gated electronic drum fills, which modernized the track. Not counting the preproduction time in Houston and Los Angeles, it took us four months to make. Recycler was one of our longer projects. I think it took extra time because we moved to Memphis Sound studios on Beale Street. That area is chock full of distractions."

The sessions ultimately saw the band returning to their blues roots, and would be the last ZZ Top album to utilize the synthesized production style of their previous two albums, which was subsequently completely abandoned in favor of a more roots-oriented style on their later albums.

== Reception ==
Professional ratings
Review scores
Source	Rating
AllMusic	2/5 stars
Robert Christgau	(1-star Honorable Mention)
Entertainment Weekly	B+
Rolling Stone	4/5 stars
(The New) Rolling Stone Album Guide	3/5 stars

Stephen Thomas Erlewine of AllMusic retrospectively gave it 2 stars out of 5, stating: "The continuation of Eliminator's synthesized blues made sense on Afterburner, since it arrived two years after its predecessor. ZZ Top's choice to pursue that direction on Recycler is puzzling, since a full five years separate this from Afterburner. It's not just that they continue to follow this path; it's that they embalm it, creating a record that may be marginally ballsier than its predecessor, but lacking the sense of goofy fun and warped ambition that made Afterburner fascinating. [...] And the worst thing about it all, it doesn't seem like the band realizes how uncomfortably ironic the title of "Recycler" is." Erlewine did however note that "Doubleback" and especially "My Head's in Mississippi" were standouts, and "Give It Up" also got an "AMG Pick", meaning that it was another highlight.

Robert Christgau gave it a one star honorable mention, meaning "A worthy effort consumers attuned to its overriding aesthetic or individual vision may well like" and called "Concrete and Steel" and "Burger Man" as the strongest tracks.

The album peaked at No. 6 on the Billboard 200, at No. 8 on the UK Albums Chart and at No. 27 on the Australian Albums chart.

== Track listing ==
All songs by Billy Gibbons, Dusty Hill and Frank Beard.

Side one
No.	Title	Length
1.	"Concrete and Steel"	3:45
2.	"Lovething"	3:20
3.	"Penthouse Eyes"	3:49
4.	"Tell It"	4:39
5.	"My Head's in Mississippi"	4:17

Side two
No.	Title	Length
6.	"Decision or Collision"	3:59
7.	"Give It Up"	3:24
8.	"2000 Blues"	4:37
9.	"Burger Man"	3:18
10.	"Doubleback"	3:53

== Personnel ==
- Billy Gibbons – guitars, lead vocals
- Dusty Hill – bass, keyboards, backing vocals
- Frank Beard – drums, percussion

=== Production ===
- Bill Ham – production
- Terry Manning – engineering
- Barry E. Jackson – artwork

== Charts ==
=== Weekly charts ===
Weekly chart performance for Recycler
Chart (1990–91)	Peak position
Australian Albums (ARIA)	27
Austrian Albums (Ö3 Austria)	15
Dutch Albums (Album Top 100)	65
German Albums (Offizielle Top 100)	4
Hungarian Albums (MAHASZ)	22
New Zealand Albums (RMNZ)	23
Norwegian Albums (VG-lista)	2
Swedish Albums (Sverigetopplistan)	2
Swiss Albums (Schweizer Hitparade)	1
UK Albums (Official Charts)	8
US AOR (Radio & Records)	1
US Billboard 200	6

=== Year-end charts ===
1991 year-end chart performance for Recycler
Chart (1991)	Position
Canada Top Albums/CDs (RPM)	92
German Albums (Offizielle Top 100)	36
Swiss Albums (Schweizer Hitparade)	24
US Billboard 200	51

== Certifications ==
Certifications and sales for Recycler
Region	Certification	Certified units/sales
Canada (Music Canada)	Platinum	100,000^{^}
Finland (Musiikkituottajat)	Platinum	65,520
France (SNEP)	2× Gold	200,000^{*}
Germany (BVMI)	Platinum	500,000^{^}
New Zealand (RMNZ)	Gold	7,500^{^}
Sweden (GLF)	Platinum	100,000^{^}
Switzerland (IFPI Switzerland)	Platinum	50,000^{^}
United Kingdom (BPI)	Silver	60,000^{^}
United States (RIAA)	Platinum	1,000,000^{^}
^{*} Sales figures based on certification alone.^{^} Shipments figures based on certification alone.
