= Chrome, Smoke & BBQ =

Box set by ZZ Top
- Released: October 14, 2003
- Recorded: 1967–1992
- Genres: Rock, blues
- Length: 5:12:20
- Label: Warner Bros.
- Producer: Bill Ham

ZZ Top chronology
Mescalero (2003)	Chrome, Smoke & BBQ (2003)	Rancho Texicano: The Very Best of ZZ Top (2004)

Alternative cover
- Limited Edition box set

Professional ratings
Review scores
Source	Rating
AllMusic	4.5/5 stars
Rolling Stone	4/5 stars
The Rolling Stone Album Guide	4/5 stars

Chrome, Smoke & BBQ is a 4-CD box set by American rock band ZZ Top. Released in 2003, it is a compilation album of material from the band's tenures with London Records and Warner Bros. Records, recorded from 1967 to 1992. An abbreviated 2-CD version of this compilation, Rancho Texicano: The Very Best of ZZ Top (2004), was released the following year.

== Release of original mixes ==
At the time of its release in 2003, Chrome, Smoke & BBQ was noteworthy because it was the only CD release, except for the greatest hits album The Best of ZZ Top (1977/CD 1984), which used the original mixes of tracks from the band's first five studio albums. Other track or whole album CD releases for those five albums used remixed versions from 1987. (See The Six Pack box set.) These remixed versions displeased many fans because they significantly changed the sound from the original albums.

The Best of ZZ Top (1977) was first released on CD in 1984, and uses the original track mixes for the CD. It includes one track from ZZ Top's First Album, two from Rio Grande Mud, four from Tres Hombres and three from Fandango!. Tres Hombres and Fandango! were reissued on CD in 2006, and were remastered using the original mixes. Chrome, Smoke & BBQ is the first ZZ Top track compilation release to include anything from the Tejas album.

In 2013, Warner Bros. Records released the CD box set The Complete Studio Albums 1970–1990, which includes the first ten ZZ Top studio albums, all with their original mixes. The timeframe of that ten album box set corresponds basically with the timeframe of Chrome, Smoke & BBQ, that is, the London Records and Warner Bros. Records recording years.

== Track listing ==
All tracks are written by Billy Gibbons, Dusty Hill and Frank Beard, except where noted.

Disc one
No.	Title	Writer(s)	Original album	Length
1.	"You Make Me Shake" (by Moving Sidewalks)	Gibbons	Flash (1969)	3:02
2.	"Joe Blues" (by Moving Sidewalks)	Gibbons, Dan Mitchell, Tom Moore, Don Summers	Flash	7:36
3.	"Crimson Witch" (by Moving Sidewalks)	Gibbons	Flash	3:03
4.	"Miller's Farm"	Gibbons	B-side of "Salt Lick" single (1970)	2:36
5.	"Salt Lick"	Gibbons	Non-album single (1970)	2:46
6.	"Brown Sugar"	Gibbons	ZZ Top's First Album (1971)	5:22
7.	"Goin' Down to Mexico"	Gibbons, Hill, Bill Ham	ZZ Top's First Album	3:22
8.	"Just Got Back from Baby's"	Gibbons, Ham	ZZ Top's First Album	4:10
9.	"Francine"	Gibbons, Kenny Cordray, Steve Perron	Rio Grande Mud (1972)	3:34
10.	"Just Got Paid"	Gibbons, Ham	Rio Grande Mud	4:28
11.	"Ko Ko Blue"		Rio Grande Mud	4:32
12.	"Chevrolet"	Gibbons	Rio Grande Mud	3:21
13.	"Bar-B-Q"	Gibbons, Ham	Rio Grande Mud	3:28
14.	"Sure Got Cold After the Rain Fell"	Gibbons	Rio Grande Mud	7:20
15.	"Whiskey 'n' Mama"	Gibbons, Hill, Beard, Ham	Rio Grande Mud	3:22
16.	"La Grange"		Tres Hombres (1973)	3:53
17.	"Waitin' for the Bus"	Gibbons, Hill	Tres Hombres	2:53
18.	"Jesus Just Left Chicago"		Tres Hombres	3:30
19.	"Beer Drinkers & Hell Raisers"		Tres Hombres	3:25
20.	"Master of Sparks"	Gibbons	Tres Hombres	3:30

Disc two
No.	Title	Writer(s)	Original album	Length
1.	"Precious and Grace"		Tres Hombres	3:11
2.	"Shiek"	Gibbons, Hill	Tres Hombres	4:06
3.	"Thunderbird" (live)		Fandango! (1975)	3:04
4.	"Jailhouse Rock" (live)	Jerry Leiber, Mike Stoller	Fandango!	1:55
5.	"Nasty Dogs and Funky Kings"		Fandango!	2:45
6.	"Heard It on the X"		Fandango!	2:26
7.	"Blue Jean Blues"		Fandango!	4:45
8.	"Mexican Blackbird"		Fandango!	3:06
9.	"Tush"		Fandango!	2:18
10.	"It's Only Love"		Tejas (1976)	4:23
11.	"Arrested for Driving While Blind"		Tejas	3:06
12.	"El Diablo"		Tejas	4:22
13.	"Enjoy and Get It On"		Tejas	3:25
14.	"She's a Heartbreaker"		Tejas	3:03
15.	"Asleep in the Desert"	Gibbons	Tejas	3:29
16.	"I Thank You"	Isaac Hayes, David Porter	Degüello (1979)	3:26
17.	"Cheap Sunglasses"		Degüello	4:48
18.	"I'm Bad, I'm Nationwide"		Degüello	4:49
19.	"A Fool for Your Stockings"		Degüello	4:15
20.	"Degüello album radio spot"			1:02
21.	"Manic Mechanic"		Degüello	2:38
22.	"She Loves My Automobile"		Degüello	2:24
23.	"Leila"		El Loco (1981)	3:16
24.	"Tube Snake Boogie"		El Loco	3:02

Disc three
No.	Title	Original album	Length
1.	"I Wanna Drive You Home"	El Loco	4:48
2.	"It's So Hard"	El Loco	5:11
3.	"Pearl Necklace"	El Loco	4:06
4.	"Heaven, Hell or Houston"	El Loco	2:33
5.	"Gimme All Your Lovin'"	Eliminator (1983)	4:00
6.	"Got Me Under Pressure"	Eliminator	4:01
7.	"TV Dinners"	Eliminator	3:51
8.	"Sharp Dressed Man"	Eliminator	4:14
9.	"Legs" (single mix)	Eliminator	3:36
10.	"I Got the Six"	Eliminator	2:53
11.	"Dirty Dog"	Eliminator	4:03
12.	"If I Could Only Flag Her Down"	Eliminator	3:42
13.	"Sleeping Bag"	Afterburner (1985)	4:04
14.	"Stages"	Afterburner	3:34
15.	"Woke Up with Wood"	Afterburner	3:47
16.	"Rough Boy"	Afterburner	4:52
17.	"Can't Stop Rockin'"	Afterburner	3:05
18.	"Planet of Women"	Afterburner	4:09
19.	"Velcro Fly"	Afterburner	3:31
20.	"Delirious"	Afterburner	3:40

Disc four
No.	Title	Writer(s)	Original album	Length
1.	"Concrete and Steel"		Recycler (1990)	3:50
2.	"Lovething"		Recycler	3:26
3.	"Penthouse Eyes"		Recycler	3:50
4.	"My Head's in Mississippi"		Recycler	4:20
5.	"Give It Up"		Recycler	3:32
6.	"Doubleback"		Recycler	3:58
7.	"2000 Blues"		Recycler	4:42
8.	"Reverberation (Doubt)"	Roky Erickson, Tommy Hall, Stacy Sutherland	Where the Pyramid Meets the Eye: A Tribute to Roky Erickson (1990)	3:03
9.	"Viva Las Vegas"	Doc Pomus, Mort Shuman	Greatest Hits (1992)	4:46
10.	"Gun Love"		Greatest Hits	3:42
11.	"Francine" (Spanish version)	Gibbons, Cordray, Perron	"Francine" single (1972)	2:56
12.	"Cheap Sunglasses" (live)		"Cheap Sunglasses" single (1979)	5:14
13.	"Legs" (dance mix)		"Legs" single (1984)	7:57
14.	"Viva Las Vegas" (12" remix)	Pomus, Shuman	"Viva La Vegas" single (1992)	8:39
15.	"Give It Up" (2,800 Mile remix)		"Give It Up" single (1990)	6:25
16.	"Velcro Fly" (12" remix)		"Velcro Fly" single (1986)	6:38

== Personnel ==
=== ZZ Top ===
- Billy Gibbons – guitar, vocals
- Dusty Hill - bass, keyboards, vocals
- Frank Beard - drums, percussion

=== Production and engineering ===
- Steve Ames – Producer
- James Austin – Liner Notes, Compilation Producer
- Robin Brian – Engineer
- Neal Ceppos – Mixing
- Bert Frilot – Engineer
- Bill Ham – Producer, Executive Producer
- Joe Hardy – Engineer
- Doyle E. Jones – Engineer
- Terry Kane – Engineer
- Bob Ludwig – Engineer
- Terry Manning – Engineer
- Larry Nix – Engineer
- Jim Reeves – Engineer

=== Photography ===
- Bob Alford – Photography
- Hugh Brown – Photography
- George Craig – Photography
- George DuBose – Photography
- Ross Halfin – Photography
- Mika Hashimoto – Photography
- Lee – Photography
- Dee Lippingwell – Photography
- Tony Mottram – Photography
- Bill Reitzel – Photography
- Bill Straus – Photography
- Jodi Summers – Photography
- Charlyn Zlotnik – Photography

=== Other ===
- Farrah Fawcett – quotes researched and compiled
- David Lynch – quotes researched and compiled
- Bob Merlis – Interviewer
- Ann Richards – quotes researched and compiled
- Kid Rock – quotes researched and compiled
- Billy Bob Thornton – quotes researched and compiled
- Tom Vickers – liner notes
- Dwight Yoakam – quotes researched and compiled
