= Rancho Texicano: The Very Best of ZZ Top =

Greatest hits album by ZZ Top
- Released: June 8, 2004
- Recorded: 1970–1992
- Length: 153:54
- Label: Rhino
- Producer: Bill Ham

ZZ Top chronology
Chrome, Smoke & BBQ (2003)	Rancho Texicano: The Very Best of ZZ Top (2004)	Live from Texas (2008)

Professional ratings
Review scores
Source	Rating
Allmusic	4.5/5 stars
The Rolling Stone Album Guide	4.5/5 stars
Tom Hull	A−

Rancho Texicano: The Very Best of ZZ Top is a greatest hits album by the rock band ZZ Top. It was released in 2004 on Rhino Entertainment. The title is a portmanteau of "texan" and "mexicano", meaning "Tex-mex Ranch". The 2-CD compilation is essentially a pared-down version of the 4-CD box set Chrome, Smoke & BBQ, released the previous year. All songs are original mixes that have been digitally remastered.

== Track listing ==
All tracks are written by Billy Gibbons, Dusty Hill and Frank Beard, except where noted.

Disc one
No.	Title	Writer(s)	Original album	Length
1.	"Brown Sugar"	Gibbons	ZZ Top's First Album (1971)	5:22
2.	"Goin' Down to Mexico"	Gibbons, Hill, Bill Ham	ZZ Top's First Album	3:22
3.	"Just Got Back from Baby's"	Gibbons, Ham	ZZ Top's First Album	4:10
4.	"Francine"	Gibbons, Kenny Cordray, Steve Perron	Rio Grande Mud (1972)	3:34
5.	"Just Got Paid"	Gibbons, Ham	Rio Grande Mud	4:28
6.	"Bar-B-Q"	Gibbons, Ham	Rio Grande Mud	3:28
7.	"La Grange"		Tres Hombres (1973)	3:53
8.	"Waitin' for the Bus"	Gibbons, Hill	Tres Hombres	2:53
9.	"Jesus Just Left Chicago"		Tres Hombres	3:30
10.	"Beer Drinkers & Hell Raisers"		Tres Hombres	3:25
11.	"Mexican Blackbird"		Fandango! (1975)	3:06
12.	"Tush"		Fandango!	2:18
13.	"Thunderbird" (live)		Fandango!	3:04
14.	"Blue Jean Blues"		Fandango!	4:45
15.	"Heard It on the X"		Fandango!	2:26
16.	"It's Only Love"		Tejas (1976)	4:23
17.	"Arrested for Driving While Blind"		Tejas	3:06
18.	"I Thank You"	Isaac Hayes, David Porter	Degüello (1979)	3:26
19.	"Cheap Sunglasses"		Degüello	4:48
20.	"I'm Bad, I'm Nationwide"		Degüello	4:49
21.	"A Fool for Your Stockings"		Degüello	4:15

Disc two
No.	Title	Writer(s)	Original album	Length
1.	"Tube Snake Boogie"		El Loco (1981)	3:02
2.	"Pearl Necklace"		El Loco	4:06
3.	"Gimme All Your Lovin'"		Eliminator (1983)	4:00
4.	"Sharp Dressed Man"		Eliminator	4:01
5.	"Legs" (single mix)		Eliminator	3:36
6.	"Got Me Under Pressure"		Eliminator	4:01
7.	"Sleeping Bag"		Afterburner (1985)	4:04
8.	"Stages"		Afterburner	3:34
9.	"Rough Boy"		Afterburner	4:52
10.	"Velcro Fly"		Afterburner	3:31
11.	"Woke Up with Wood"		Afterburner	3:47
12.	"Doubleback"		Recycler (1990)	3:58
13.	"My Head's in Mississippi"		Recycler	4:20
14.	"Viva Las Vegas"	Doc Pomus, Mort Shuman	Greatest Hits (1992)	4:46
15.	"Cheap Sunglasses" (live)		"Cheap Sunglasses" single (1979)	5:14
16.	"Legs" (dance mix)		"Legs" single (1984)	7:57
17.	"Velcro Fly" (12" remix)		"Velcro Fly" single (1986)	6:38

== Personnel ==
- Billy Gibbons - guitar, vocals
- Dusty Hill - bass, keyboards, backing vocals, lead vocals on "Goin' Down to Mexico", "Tush", and "Viva Las Vegas", co-lead vocals on "Beer Drinkers and Hell Raisers", "Heard It on the X", and "It's Only Love"
- Frank Beard - drums, percussion

== Charts ==
Album - Billboard (United States)

Year	Chart	Position
2004	The Billboard 200	77
2012	The Billboard 200	30

== Certifications ==
Region	Certification	Certified units/sales
United Kingdom (BPI)	Silver	60,000^{^}
^{^} Shipments figures based on certification alone.
