= The Six Pack (ZZ Top box set) =

Box set by ZZ Top
- Released: 1987
- Recorded: 1969–81
- Length: 212:52
- Label: Warner Bros.
- Producer: Bill Ham

ZZ Top chronology
Afterburner (1985)	The Six Pack (1987)	Recycler (1990)

The Six Pack is a box set released in 1987 by the American rock band ZZ Top. It comprises their first five albums, plus their seventh album, El Loco (1981). All the albums except El Loco and the live side of Fandango! were remixed with new drums and guitar effects for a more "contemporary" sound, similar to ZZ Top's eighth album, Eliminator (1983). Until 2006, these remixes were the only versions of the albums available on CD. British musician and producer Alan Parsons had also remixed his first 1976 Project album Tales of Mystery and Imagination in the same manner to achieve the same sound, which was also released in 1987. The band's sixth album Degüello (1979) was not included as it was already available on CD individually.

== Reception ==
Professional ratings
Review scores
Source	Rating
AllMusic	2/5 stars
The Rolling Stone Album Guide	3.5/5 stars

Reviewing The Six Pack for AllMusic, Stephen Thomas Erlewine wrote: "If Six Pack just delivered the original albums, it'd be a good investment, but the studio tinkering makes this a disaster."

== Later reissues ==
The Six Pack remixes were also used on the individual CD releases of the albums and all following compilations of the band (except the CD release of 1977's The Best of ZZ Top) for the next few years. Original mixes were first remastered for the box set Chrome, Smoke & BBQ, and its companion compilation release Rancho Texicano.

In 2006, the original mixes of Tres Hombres and Fandango! were released on CD. Some tracks from the remaining three albums were unavailable digitally in their original versions until 2013 when the albums were re-released on CD with the original mixes restored. All more recent compilations used original mixes.

== Track listing ==
Disc one – ZZ Top's First Album & Rio Grande Mud
No.	Title	Writer(s)	Length
1.	"Somebody Else Been Shaking Your Tree"	Billy Gibbons	2:29
2.	"Brown Sugar"	Gibbons	5:20
3.	"Squank"	Gibbons, Bill Ham, Dusty Hill	2:49
4.	"Goin' Down to Mexico"	Gibbons, Ham, Hill	3:23
5.	"Old Man"	Frank Beard, Gibbons, Hill	3:31
6.	"Neighbor, Neighbor"	Gibbons	2:19
7.	"Certified Blues"	Beard, Gibbons, Ham	3:26
8.	"Bedroom Thang"	Gibbons	3:53
9.	"Just Got Back from Baby's"	Gibbons, Ham	4:10
10.	"Backdoor Love Affair"	Gibbons, Ham	2:42
11.	"Francine"	Kenny Cordray, Gibbons, Steve Perron	2:53
12.	"Just Got Paid"	Gibbons, Ham	3:48
13.	"Mushmouth Shoutin'"	Gibbons, Ham	3:45
14.	"Ko Ko Blue"	Beard, Gibbons, Hill	4:23
15.	"Chevrolet"	Gibbons	3:19
16.	"Apologies to Pearly"	Beard, Gibbons, Ham, Hill	2:45
17.	"Bar-B-Q"	Gibbons, Ham	3:22
18.	"Sure Got Cold After the Rain Fell"	Gibbons	6:47
19.	"Whiskey’n Mama"	Beard, Gibbons, Ham, Hill	3:20
20.	"Down Brownie"	Gibbons	2:26

Disc two – Tres Hombres & Fandango!
No.	Title	Writer(s)	Length
1.	"Waitin' for the Bus"	Gibbons, Hill	2:59
2.	"Jesus Just Left Chicago"	Beard, Gibbons, Hill	3:29
3.	"Beer Drinkers & Hell Raisers"	Beard, Gibbons, Hill	3:23
4.	"Master of Sparks"	Gibbons	3:33
5.	"Hot, Blue and Righteous"	Gibbons	3:14
6.	"Move Me on Down the Line"	Gibbons, Hill	2:30
7.	"Precious and Grace"	Beard, Gibbons, Hill	3:09
8.	"La Grange"	Beard, Gibbons, Hill	3:51
9.	"Shiek"	Gibbons, Hill	4:04
10.	"Have You Heard?"	Gibbons, Hill	3:14
11.	"Thunderbird" (Live)	Beard, Gibbons, Hill	2:49
12.	"Jailhouse Rock" (Live)	Jerry Leiber, Mike Stoller	1:56
13.	"Backdoor Medley" (Live – "Backdoor Love Affair"* / "Mellow Down Easy"** / "Backdoor Love Affair No.2"*** / "Long Distance Boogie"****)	*Gibbons, Ham / **Willie Dixon / ***Gibbons / ****John Lee Hooker	9:23
14.	"Nasty Dogs and Funky Kings"	Beard, Gibbons, Hill	2:42
15.	"Blue Jean Blues"	Beard, Gibbons, Hill	4:42
16.	"Balinese"	Beard, Gibbons, Hill	2:37
17.	"Mexican Blackbird"	Beard, Gibbons, Hill	3:06
18.	"Heard It on the X"	Beard, Gibbons, Hill	2:23
19.	"Tush"	Beard, Gibbons, Hill	2:14

Disc three – Tejas & El Loco
No.	Title	Writer(s)	Length
1.	"It's Only Love"	Beard, Gibbons, Hill	4:24
2.	"Arrested for Driving While Blind"	Beard, Gibbons, Hill	3:05
3.	"El Diablo"	Beard, Gibbons, Hill	4:20
4.	"Snappy Kakkie"	Beard, Gibbons, Hill	2:56
5.	"Enjoy and Get It On"	Beard, Gibbons, Hill	3:23
6.	"Ten Dollar Man"	Beard, Gibbons, Hill	3:42
7.	"Pan Am Highway Blues"	Beard, Gibbons, Hill	3:15
8.	"Avalon Hideaway"	Beard, Gibbons, Hill	3:07
9.	"She's a Heartbreaker"	Beard, Gibbons, Hill	3:02
10.	"Asleep in the Desert"	Gibbons	3:24
11.	"Tube Snake Boogie"	Beard, Gibbons, Hill	3:02
12.	"I Wanna Drive You Home"	Beard, Gibbons, Hill	4:44
13.	"Ten Foot Pole"	Beard, Gibbons, Hill	4:19
14.	"Leila"	Beard, Gibbons, Hill	3:13
15.	"Don't Tease Me"	Beard, Gibbons, Hill	4:19
16.	"It's So Hard"	Beard, Gibbons, Hill	5:12
17.	"Pearl Necklace"	Beard, Gibbons, Hill	4:01
18.	"Groovy Little Hippie Pad"	Beard, Gibbons, Hill	2:40
19.	"Heaven, Hell or Houston"	Beard, Gibbons, Hill	2:31
20.	"Party on the Patio"	Beard, Gibbons, Hill	2:48

== Personnel ==
=== ZZ Top ===
- Billy Gibbons – guitar, vocals
- Dusty Hill – bass guitar, vocals
- Frank Beard – drums, percussion

== Charts ==
Chart (1987)	Peak position
Australia (Kent Music Report)	99
