= Sharp Dressed Men: A Tribute to ZZ Top =

Compilation album by Various Artists
- Released: April 30, 2002
- Genre: Country
- Length: 1:06:44
- Label: RCA
- Producer: Pete Anderson, Ray Benson, Kix Brooks, Tracy Byrd, Buddy Cannon, Kenny Chesney, Greg Droman, Ronnie Dunn, Ben Fowler, Joe Funderburk, Byron Gallimore, Andy Griggs, Dann Huff, Tom Keifer, Anthony Martin, Frank Rogers, Joe Scaife, Keith Stegall, Billy Joe Walker Jr., Brad Warren, Hank Williams III, Hank Williams Jr., Norro Wilson

Professional ratings
Review scores
Source	Rating
Allmusic	4/5 stars

Sharp Dressed Men: A Tribute to ZZ Top is a tribute album released in 2002 featuring various country music artists performing classic ZZ Top songs.

== Critical reception ==
Stephen Thomas Erlewine of Allmusic said that the album was "crackling with energy and with just enough vivid reinterpretations to make it enjoyable for fans of either the artists involved or ZZ Top."

Brian Baker of Country Standard Time writes, "A little more grit and the compilers would have had a rocking ZZ Top tribute. Of course, a little more honky tonk and hillbilly (like Alan Jackson throws down at the break in "Sure Got Cold After the Rain Fell"), and they would have had a country tribute to ZZ Top."

== Track listing ==
All tracks are written by Billy F. Gibbons, Dusty Hill and Frank Beard, unless otherwise noted.

No.	Title	Writer(s)	Artist	Length
1.	"Gimme All Your Lovin'" (Eliminator (1983))		Lonestar	4:21
2.	"Sharp Dressed Man" (Eliminator)		Brad Paisley	3:46
3.	"Jesus Just Left Chicago/Waitin' for the Bus" (Tres Hombres (1973))		Hank Williams Jr.	8:14
4.	"La Grange" (Tres Hombres)		Tracy Byrd	3:50
5.	"Rough Boy" (Afterburner (1985))		Brooks & Dunn	4:51
6.	"I'm Bad, I'm Nationwide" (Degüello (1979))		Dwight Yoakam	4:14
7.	"She Loves My Automobile" (Degüello)		Willie Nelson	2:25
8.	"I Need You Tonight" (Eliminator)		Andy Griggs	4:16
9.	"Cheap Sunglasses" (Degüello)		The Warren Brothers	6:03
10.	"Legs" (Eliminator)		Trace Adkins	4:17
11.	"Tush" (Fandango! (1975))		Kenny Chesney	3:28
12.	"Just Got Paid" (Rio Grande Mud (1972))		Montgomery Gentry	3:53
13.	"I Thank You" (Degüello)	Isaac Hayes; David Porter	Phil Vassar	3:04
14.	"Fearless Boogie" (XXX (1999))		Hank Williams III	3:59
15.	"Sure Got Cold After the Rain Fell" (Rio Grande Mud)	Billy F. Gibbons	Alan Jackson	6:15
Total length:				66:56

- Track information and credits verified from the album's liner notes.

== Chart performance ==
Chart (2002)	Peak position
U.S. Billboard Top Country Albums	7
U.S. Billboard 200	81
