= 2010 World Tour =

2010 concert tour by ZZ Top

- World tour by ZZ Top
- Location: North America; South America; Europe
- Start date: April 23, 2010
- End date: October 29, 2010
- Legs: 4
- No. of shows: 98

ZZ Top concert chronology
- Double Down Live Tour (2009); 2010 World Tour; Australian Tour (2011)

The 2010 World Tour was a concert tour by rock band ZZ Top, which began in April 2010 and ended in December 2010. Like recent previous tours, it was a short outing, though for the first time in the band's career, they performed in South America, including three shows in Brazil. The band played many of their classic 1970s and 1980s hits. Critical reaction to the tour's shows was generally positive, although the absence of new material was noted. A great number of tickets were sold within a month of the tour's announcement, which prompted more dates to be added.

== Itinerary ==
On December 11, 2009, it was confirmed that ZZ Top would be headlining the High Voltage Festival in July 2010. The band announced five dates in South America, including three shows in Brazil; a video message by Billy Gibbons (speaking in Spanish) was posted on the band's official website for fans in Chile. Pre-sales began a month later and, according to ZZ Top's official Twitter, tickets for the May 20th show in São Paulo were sold-out. By the time the first North American leg was underway, more US concerts were announced, including festivals like Summerfest, Rocklahoma, and the Crossroads Guitar Festival. Subsequent dates with Tom Petty and the Heartbreakers in the fall were announced as well. This forced the band to cancel many previously booked engagements, several of them being with the Mick Fleetwood Blues Band; shows at the Telluride Blues & Brews Festival in Colorado, Kansas State Fair, and Meadowbrook U.S. Cellular Pavilion in New Hampshire were canceled. After touring Europe in the summer, the band returned to North America, where they toured with Tom Petty and the Heartbreakers. In October 2010, they made a brief stop in Europe, where the Doobie Brothers opened shows in Belgium, the Netherlands, and Norway.

== Development ==
Donny Stuart was the production manager and has been with ZZ Top for the last four decades. In 1999, ZZ Top hired Toby Francis as front of house engineer, who had previously worked with Jane's Addiction and Guns N' Roses. Francis left in late 2010 to work with The Smashing Pumpkins and the band hired Jamie Rephann as a replacement. Jake Mann, from Clair Brothers, was the monitor engineer and has worked with the band for four years. Chris Stuba was the lighting designer, working with lighting technician Bobby Dominguez and assistant lighting technician Jeff Archibeque.

The sound was provided by Clair, consisting of Martin Audio products including WSX subwoofers and W8C loudspeakers, which were powered by Martin MA 2.8 and 4.2 power amplifiers. Billy Gibbons and Dusty Hill did not use stage monitors or in-ear monitors; instead they relied on custom-made speaker cabinets to monitor themselves, a ritual that both Gibbons and Hill have used for years. Bandit Lites provided the lighting package, including mostly Vari-Lite fixtures, with VL3000 and VL2500 spotlights, as well as VL3500 floodlights. Martin Light MAC2000 floodlights, Atomic 3000 strobe lights and Color Kinetics ColorBlast 12 LED fixtures completed the lighting package. The lighting was controlled by a grandMA lighting control console. In 2005, the band had custom microphone stands made by John A. Douglas, who designed one of several skull-themed drum kits for Frank Beard used on the tour. The stands were made from truck exhaust pipes and had color-changing LED tubes built inside. Microphones were Telefunken M80s that were chrome plated.

Before beginning rehearsals for the tour, ZZ Top held a poll on their official website, asking fans to vote for their top three favorite songs. The results revealed that four songs were actually added to the band's set list: "Beer Drinkers and Hell Raisers", "Viva Las Vegas", "Francine", and "Thunderbird". The main set would include five songs from Eliminator (1983), three songs from Tres Hombres (1973), and two songs from Rio Grande Mud (1972); highlights in the show were a medley of "La Grange", "Sloppy Drunk Blues", and "Bar-B-Q". Billy Gibbons and Dusty Hill wore custom-made jackets designed by Jaime Castaneda, who has worked for Nudie Cohn and Manuel Cuevas; their jackets usually consisted of rhinestones.

== Concert synopsis ==
With the house lights down, the show began with a house music introduction. After about 50–60 seconds, the microphone stands would be lit, usually in a red color, and the band members would walk on stage. They started with a performance of "Got Me Under Pressure". The next song was "Waitin' for the Bus", which segued into "Jesus Just Left Chicago". After a performance of "Pincushion", they would play "I'm Bad, I'm Nationwide". The show continued with a 'blues hat' skit, in which Gibbons would ask for 'technicians' (one of them being Gibbons' wife) to hand him his fedora. This led into covers of "Future Blues" by Willie Brown and "Rock Me Baby" by B.B. King, followed by "Cheap Sunglasses". A snippet of "My Head's In Mississippi" was included before leading into a brief guitar solo by Gibbons and performing "I Need You Tonight". After playing a cover of Jimi Hendrix's "Hey Joe", the band performed "Brown Sugar" from their 1971 debut album, along with "Party on the Patio" from El Loco (1981) and "Just Got Paid" from Rio Grande Mud. The main set ended with "Gimme All Your Lovin'", "Sharp Dressed Man", and "Legs". After a brief break, the band returned to the stage. The encore began with the "La Grange" medley, which included a cover of "Sloppy Drunk Blues" and "Bar-B-Q" from Rio Grande Mud. "Tush" always closed the show. "Viva Las Vegas" was sometimes preceded "La Grange". In addition, "Beer Drinkers and Hell Raisers", "Viva Las Vegas", "Francine", and "Thunderbird" were variously performed only during the first North American leg.

== Tour dates ==
List of concerts, showing date, city, country, venue, tickets sold, number of available tickets and amount of gross revenue
Date	City	Country	Venue	Opening act(s)	Attendance	Revenue
Leg 1: North and South America
April 23, 2010	Tyler	United States	The Oil Palace	Jonathan Tyler and the Northern Lights	—N/a	—N/a
April 24, 2010	Beaumont	United States	Ford Park	Edgar Winter; Jonathan Tyler and the Northern Lights	—N/a	—N/a
April 25, 2010	Bee Cave	United States	The Backyard at Bee Cave	Jonathan Tyler and the Northern Lights	—N/a	—N/a
April 29, 2010	West Palm Beach	United States	SunFest	Jonathan Tyler and the Northern Lights; White Collar Crime	—N/a	—N/a
April 30, 2010	Melbourne	United States	Maxwell C. King Center		1,939 / 1,939	$128,573
May 1, 2010	St. Petersburg	United States	Tropicana Field		34,813 / 36,973	—N/a
May 4, 2010	Jacksonville	United States	Moran Theater	Jonathan Tyler and the Northern Lights	1,442 / 2,500	$81,569
May 5, 2010	Columbus	United States	Columbus Civic Center	Jonathan Tyler and the Northern Lights	—N/a	—N/a
May 7, 2010	Little Rock	United States	Riverfest Amphitheatre	Jonathan Tyler and the Northern Lights	1,930 / 3,500	$104,011
May 8, 2010	Atlanta	United States	Chastain Park Amphitheater	Jonathan Tyler and the Northern Lights	3,710 / 6,700	$213,145
May 9, 2010	Tupelo	United States	BancorpSouth Center	Jonathan Tyler and the Northern Lights	2,863 / 3,500	$96,538
May 14, 2010	Belton	United States	Bell County Expo Center	Jonathan Tyler and the Northern Lights	—N/a	—N/a
May 18, 2010	Santiago	Chile	Movistar Arena	El Cruce; Harrison Trio	—N/a	—N/a
May 20, 2010	São Paulo	Brazil	Via Funchal	Hudson Cadorini; Banda Rollemax	—N/a	—N/a
May 21, 2010	São Paulo	Brazil	Via Funchal	Hudson Cadorini; Banda Rollemax	—N/a	—N/a
May 23, 2010	Porto Alegre	Brazil	Pepsi on Stage		—N/a	—N/a
May 26, 2010	Buenos Aires	Argentina	Estadio Luna Park		—N/a	—N/a
May 28, 2010	Speedway	United States	Indianapolis Motor Speedway		—N/a	—N/a
May 29, 2010	Pryor	United States	Rocklahoma	Cinderella; Saliva	—N/a	—N/a
June 5, 2010	Vancouver	Canada	Thunderbird Sports Centre	Wide Mouth Mason	—N/a	—N/a
June 6, 2010	Victoria	Canada	Save-On-Foods Memorial Centre	Wide Mouth Mason	—N/a	—N/a
June 8, 2010	Cranbrook	Canada	Cranbrook Recreational Complex	Wide Mouth Mason	—N/a	—N/a
June 9, 2010	Cranbrook	Canada	Cranbrook Recreational Complex	Wide Mouth Mason	—N/a	—N/a
June 10, 2010	Grande Prairie	Canada	Crystal Centre	Wide Mouth Mason	—N/a	—N/a
June 11, 2010	Edmonton	Canada	Northern Alberta Jubilee Auditorium	Wide Mouth Mason	—N/a	—N/a
June 13, 2010	Medicine Hat	Canada	Medicine Hat Arena	Wide Mouth Mason	—N/a	—N/a
June 15, 2010	Winnipeg	Canada	MTS Centre	Wide Mouth Mason	—N/a	—N/a
June 16, 2010	Thunder Bay	Canada	Thunder Bay Community Auditorium	Wide Mouth Mason	—N/a	—N/a
June 19, 2010	Belleville	Canada	Big Music Fest	Collective Soul; Finger Eleven	—N/a	—N/a
June 23, 2010	Bloomington	United States	U.S. Cellular Coliseum	Backyard Tire Fire	—N/a	—N/a
June 24, 2010	Muskegon	United States	Heritage Landing	Mid-Life Crisis	—N/a	—N/a
June 25, 2010	Milwaukee	United States	Marcus Amphitheater		35,817 / 45,774	$2,331,045
June 26, 2010	Milwaukee	United States	Marcus Amphitheater		35,817 / 45,774	$2,331,045
Leg 2: Europe
July 2, 2010	Skånevik	Norway	Skånevikfjorden	Bjørn Berge	—N/a	—N/a
July 3, 2010	Järvenpää	Finland	Vanhankylänniemi	John Lee Hooker Jr. Eddie Cotton	—N/a	—N/a
July 5, 2010	Monte Carlo	Monaco	Prince's Palace of Monaco	The Stooges; PPZ Rocket	—N/a	—N/a
July 6, 2010	Toulouse	France	Zénith de Toulouse	Joe Bonamassa	—N/a	—N/a
July 8, 2010	Bayonne	France	Arènes de Bayonne	Joe Bonamassa	—N/a	—N/a
July 9, 2010	Nîmes	France	Arena of Nîmes	Joe Bonamassa	—N/a	—N/a
July 10, 2010	Locarno	Switzerland	Piazza Grande	Jeff Beck	—N/a	—N/a
July 12, 2010	Rome	Italy	Ippodromo delle Capannelle	Pino Scotto	—N/a	—N/a
July 13, 2010	Lucca	Italy	Piazza Napoleone	Jeff Beck	—N/a	—N/a
July 14, 2010	Padova	Italy	Villa Contarini	Maurizio Solieri Band	—N/a	—N/a
July 15, 2010	Vigevano	Italy	Castello Sforzesco	Tower of Power	—N/a	—N/a
July 16, 2010	Aix-les-Bains	France	Lac du Bourget	Pete Doherty; Gogol Bordello	—N/a	—N/a
July 18, 2010	Kempten	Germany	bigBOX Allgäu	Siggi Schwarz	—N/a	—N/a
July 19, 2010	Strasbourg	France	Zénith de Strasbourg	Philip Sayce	—N/a	—N/a
July 20, 2010	Tienen	Belgium	Grote Markt	John Fogerty; Manzarek–Krieger	—N/a	—N/a
July 22, 2010	Nantes	France	Zénith de Nantes Métropole	Philip Sayce	—N/a	—N/a
July 24, 2010	London	England	Victoria Park	Heaven & Hell; Foreigner	—N/a	—N/a
Leg 3: North America
July 31, 2010	Stillwater	United States	Tumbleweed Concert Arena	Corey Smith	—N/a	—N/a
August 1, 2010	Southaven	United States	Snowden Grove Amphitheater	Young Guns	3,958 / 10,353	$87,985
August 4, 2010	Clearfield	United States	Clearfield County Fair		—N/a	—N/a
August 7, 2010	Wisconsin Dells	United States	Crystal Grand Music Theatre		—N/a	—N/a
August 9, 2010	Sturgis	United States	Buffalo Chip Campground	Buckcherry	—N/a	—N/a
August 10, 2010	Sioux Falls	United States	Sioux Empire Fair	The Lugnuts	—N/a	—N/a
August 13, 2010	West Wendover	United States	Peppermill Wendover		—N/a	—N/a
August 14, 2010	Murphys	United States	Ironstone Amphitheatre	Joan Jett & the Blackhearts	—N/a	—N/a
August 15, 2010	Costa Mesa	United States	Pacific Amphitheatre		—N/a	—N/a
August 19, 2010	Albuquerque	United States	Legends Theater		—N/a	—N/a
August 20, 2010	Las Vegas	United States	Las Vegas Hilton		—N/a	—N/a
August 21, 2010	Las Vegas	United States	Las Vegas Hilton		—N/a	—N/a
August 22, 2010	Jackpot	United States	Cactus Pete's		—N/a	—N/a
August 24, 2010	Lancaster	United States	Antelope Valley Fair		—N/a	—N/a
August 25, 2010	Livermore	United States	Wente Vineyards		—N/a	—N/a
August 27, 2010	Salem	United States	L.B. Day Comcast Amphitheatre		—N/a	—N/a
August 29, 2010	Snoqualmie	United States	Snoqualmie Casino		—N/a	—N/a
September 2, 2010	Avila Beach	United States	Avila Beach Golf Resort	Tommy Castro	—N/a	—N/a
September 3, 2010	Mountain View	United States	Shoreline Amphitheatre	Eagles of Death Metal	—N/a	—N/a
September 4, 2010	Del Mar	United States	Del Mar Racetrack		—N/a	—N/a
September 5, 2010	Laughlin	United States	Aquarius Casino Resort		—N/a	—N/a
September 9, 2010	Orillia	Canada	Casino Rama Entertainment Centre		—N/a	—N/a
September 10, 2010	Orillia	Canada	Casino Rama Entertainment Centre		—N/a	—N/a
September 12, 2010	New York City	United States	Beacon Theatre	Moreland and Arbuckle	4,342 / 5,162	$264,689
September 13, 2010	New York City	United States	Beacon Theatre	Moreland and Arbuckle	4,342 / 5,162	$264,689
September 14, 2010	Richmond	United States	National Theater	Barrelhouse	—N/a	—N/a
September 16, 2010	Tampa	United States	St. Pete Times Forum		14,369 / 16,755	$1,135,296
September 18, 2010	Raleigh	United States	Time Warner Cable Music Pavilion		18,456 / 19,669	$693,042
September 19, 2010	Charlotte	United States	Verizon Wireless Amphitheater		16,311 / 18,739	$677,372
September 21, 2010	Dallas	United States	Superpages.com Center		14,320 / 18,000	$787,276
September 23, 2010	Tulsa	United States	BOK Center		12,887 / 13,222	$1,055,145
September 24, 2010	The Woodlands	United States	Cynthia Woods Mitchell Pavilion		15,871 / 15,871	$1,053,362
September 26, 2010	Phoenix	United States	US Airways Center		—N/a	—N/a
September 28, 2010	Chula Vista	United States	Cricket Wireless Amphitheatre		—N/a	—N/a
October 1, 2010	Los Angeles	United States	Hollywood Bowl		17,415 / 17,415	$1,691,714
October 2, 2010	Irvine	United States	Verizon Wireless Amphitheater		14,932 / 14,932	$1,096,208
Leg 4: Europe
October 14, 2010	Graz	Austria	Stadthalle Graz		—N/a	—N/a
October 15, 2010	Zürich	Switzerland	Hallenstadion	The Doobie Brothers	—N/a	—N/a
October 16, 2010	Paris	France	Palais Omnisports de Paris-Bercy	The Doobie Brothers	8,031 / 9,286	$758,389
October 18, 2010	Brussels	Belgium	Forest National	The Doobie Brothers	—N/a	—N/a
October 19, 2010	Enschede	Netherlands	Go Planet Expo Hall	The Doobie Brothers	—N/a	—N/a
October 21, 2010	Copenhagen	Denmark	Forum Copenhagen	The Doobie Brothers	—N/a	—N/a
October 22, 2010	Gothenburg	Sweden	Scandinavium	The Doobie Brothers	—N/a	—N/a
October 23, 2010	Oslo	Norway	Oslo Spektrum	The Doobie Brothers	—N/a	—N/a
October 24, 2010	Stockholm	Sweden	Annexet		—N/a	—N/a
October 27, 2010	Saint Petersburg	Russia	Yubileyny Sports Palace		—N/a	—N/a
October 29, 2010	Moscow	Russia	Crocus City Hall		—N/a	—N/a
