= The Best of ZZ Top =

The Best of ZZ Top (10 Legendary Texas Tales)

Greatest hits album by ZZ Top
- Released: November 26, 1977
- Recorded: 1970–1975
- Genre: Rock
- Length: 34:21
- Label: London Records
- Producer: Bill Ham

ZZ Top chronology
Tejas (1976)	The Best of ZZ Top (10 Legendary Texas Tales) (1977)	Degüello (1979)

Professional ratings
Review scores
Source	Rating
AllMusic	4.5/5 stars
Christgau's Record Guide	B
The Rolling Stone Album Guide	3.5/5 stars
Tom Hull	B

The Best of ZZ Top (10 Legendary Texas Tales) is a greatest hits album by American rock band ZZ Top, released November 26, 1977. Spanning the years from 1971 to 1975, this compilation album does not contain any songs from Tejas, which was released the year before.

== Track listing ==
Side one
No.	Title	Writer(s)	Original album	Length
1.	"Tush"	Billy Gibbons, Dusty Hill, Frank Beard	Fandango! (1975)	2:14
2.	"Waitin' for the Bus"	Gibbons, Hill	Tres Hombres (1973)	2:59
3.	"Jesus Just Left Chicago"	Gibbons, Hill, Beard	Tres Hombres	3:29
4.	"Francine"	Gibbons, Kenny Cordray, Steve Perron	Rio Grande Mud (1972)	3:33
5.	"Just Got Paid"	Gibbons, Bill Ham	Rio Grande Mud	4:27

Side two
No.	Title	Writer(s)	Original album	Length
1.	"La Grange"	Gibbons, Hill, Beard	Tres Hombres	3:51
2.	"Blue Jean Blues"	Gibbons, Hill, Beard	Fandango!	4:42
3.	"Backdoor Love Affair"	Gibbons, Ham	ZZ Top's First Album (1971)	3:20
4.	"Beer Drinkers and Hell Raisers"	Gibbons, Hill, Beard	Tres Hombres	3:23
5.	"Heard It on the X"	Gibbons, Hill, Beard	Fandango!	2:23

== Personnel ==
- Billy Gibbons – guitar, vocals
- Dusty Hill – bass, backing vocals, lead vocal on "Tush", co-lead vocals on "Beer Drinkers and Hell Raisers" and "Heard It on the X"
- Frank Beard – drums, percussion

== Charts ==
Chart (1977)	Peak position
US Billboard 200	94

Chart (1984)	Peak position
Australian Albums (Kent Music Report)	44

Chart (2024)	Peak position
Hungarian Physical Albums (MAHASZ)	17

== Certifications ==
Region	Certification	Certified units/sales
Australia (ARIA)	Gold	35,000^{^}
United States (RIAA)	2× Platinum	2,000,000^{^}
^{^} Shipments figures based on certification alone.
