= VH1 Rock Honors =

Ceremony

The VH1 Rock Honors were an annual ceremony paying homage to bands who influenced the sound of rock music. The events began in 2006, and the final event took place in 2008. The general format of each show is for modern bands to "pay tribute" to classic greats of the rock/metal world (by covering a song of theirs), after which time the artist being paid tribute to plays multiple songs. The 2006 and 2007 shows featured four inductees each, whereas the 2008 show featured one (The Who), albeit with multiple bands paying tribute. The shows were directed by David Mallet and produced by Paul Flattery and Greg Sills. Currently, VH1 has no plans for a CD or DVD release of any show.

== 2006 ==
The ceremony was held at Mandalay Bay Events Center in Las Vegas, Nevada, United States on May 25, 2006. The first ever Rock Honors aired May 31, 2006, honoring rock icons Queen, Judas Priest, Def Leppard, and Kiss. The show was hosted by Jaime Pressly. In Latin America it aired on June 7.

The ceremony opened with the Foo Fighters performing the Queen classic "Tie Your Mother Down." They were soon joined by Brian May and Roger Taylor. After a biography of Queen, Queen + Paul Rodgers performed "The Show Must Go On", "We Will Rock You" and "We Are the Champions" (feat. Dave Grohl and Taylor Hawkins on drums). (The Foo Fighters had previously collaborated with May on a cover of Pink Floyd's "Have a Cigar" for the Mission: Impossible 2 soundtrack.)

Godsmack's tribute to Judas Priest followed, the band playing a medley of "Electric Eye," "Victim of Changes", and "Hell Bent for Leather". After Judas Priest's biography they performed "Breaking the Law", "The Green Manalishi (With The Two-Pronged Crown)" and "You've Got Another Thing Comin'."

The All-American Rejects then performed Def Leppard's "Photograph". During the performance, drummer Chris Gaylor wore nothing but British flag shorts - a reference to what Leppard drummer Rick Allen wore in some of the band's old music videos. After Def Leppard's biography they took the stage and performed "Rock of Ages," a long version of "Rocket" with a guitar solo, then continued to play a T.Rex cover off their newest album, Yeah!, "20th Century Boy." For this performance, Joe Elliott invited Brian May to join the band.

A supergroup was then formed of Rob Zombie, Slash, Gilby Clarke, Scott Ian, Ace Frehley, and Tommy Lee. The six then performed "God of Thunder". Kiss followed with their closing performance of "Detroit Rock City", "Deuce", "Love Gun" and for the encore they performed "Makin' Love".

== 2007 ==
The second annual Rock Honors on VH1 hosted by Bam Margera with appearances by Cameron Diaz, Robin Williams, Taylor Hawkins, Billy Bob Thornton, April Margera, Jada Pinkett Smith, and Criss Angel. This year's show paid tribute to iconic rock bands ZZ Top, Heart, Genesis, and Ozzy Osbourne. The show was also held in Las Vegas.

Nickelback started this year's ceremony, playing the hit ZZ Top song, "Sharp Dressed Man". Billy Bob Thornton then announced the Texas trio. After a biography video, the band took the stage and performed their MTV video hit "Gimme All Your Lovin'", followed by "La Grange", Dusty Hill's signature song "Tush" and finished with "Cheap Sunglasses".

Cameron Diaz then took the stage to announce the Seattle Sisters, better known as Heart. After a biography video on the band, Gretchen Wilson, assisted by Alice in Chains, performed "Barracuda", joined by Heart guitarist Nancy Wilson. Heart then took the stage and performed "Straight On", "Lost Angel", and "Crazy on You". (TV airing cut out "Lost Angel".) It was one of Alice In Chains's first appearances on live television since the death of their lead singer Layne Staley.

Robin Williams was the next presenter, and announced Genesis. After a biography video, Keane was the next tribute performer, who performed "That's All". Genesis then took the stage and performed "Turn it on Again", "No Son of Mine", and "Los Endos". (TV airing cut out "Los Endos".)

Next, in honor of Ozzy Osbourne, Bam Margera gave himself a black eye. Jada Pinkett Smith was the next presenter, who announced Osbourne. After a biography video, Queens of the Stone Age performed the Black Sabbath tune "Paranoid". Criss Angel then appeared, honoring Ozzy by biting the head off a mouse. Ozzy then took the stage, performing his new single "I Don't Wanna Stop", followed by "Bark at the Moon" and "Crazy Train". (TV airing cut out the "Bark at the Moon" performance, but it airs as a music video on shows such as Metal Mania.)

== 2008 ==
The Who were honored at the 2008 ceremony from the Pauley Pavilion at UCLA instead of the usual Las Vegas Mandalay Bay Events Center. The concert consisted of an hour-long performance by the band as well as tributes by Incubus, Pearl Jam, Foo Fighters, Flaming Lips, Adam Sandler and Tenacious D. An edited show aired on July 17, 2008. The television broadcast included commentary from other musicians, celebrities, and The Who itself describing the band's career and impact. It is also the first program in the series to pay tribute to only one artist.

The music performances included:

- Foo Fighters - "Young Man Blues" and "Bargain" (with guest lead vocals by Gaz Coombes of Supergrass)
- Incubus - "I Can See for Miles" and "I Can't Explain"
- Flaming Lips - Tommy medley
- Tenacious D - "Squeeze Box"
- Pearl Jam - "Love, Reign o'er Me" and "The Real Me"
- The Who - "Baba O'Riley", "Who Are You", "Behind Blue Eyes", "My Generation", and "Tea & Theatre"

Presenters included David Duchovny, Sean Penn, Rainn Wilson, Mila Kunis and Adam Sandler, who performed his own version of "Magic Bus." Performances not used in the TV special will be made available online at VH1.com.

The Foo Fighters presence at the 2008 show makes them the only artist to have played more than one Rock Honors show. It also makes Taylor Hawkins the only person at all three ceremonies. He played in the first and third shows and was a backstage interviewer at the second.
