= Worldwide Texas Tour =

1976–77 concert tour by ZZ Top

- Concert by ZZ Top
- Location: United States
- Associated album: Fandango!, Tejas
- Start date: May 29, 1976
- End date: December 31, 1977
- Legs: 5
- No. of shows: 98 (100 scheduled)

ZZ Top concert chronology
- Fandango! Tour (1975–76); Worldwide Texas Tour (1976–77); Expect No Quarter Tour (1979–1981)

The Worldwide Texas Tour was a concert tour by American rock band ZZ Top. Arranged in support of their 1975 album Fandango!, the band visited arenas, stadiums, and auditoriums from 1976 to 1977. The elaborate stage production was designed to bring Texas to national audiences, with regional fauna and flora.

Encompassing five legs and 97 shows, the tour began in Winston-Salem, North Carolina on May 29, 1976, and ended in Fort Worth, Texas on December 31, 1977. The band's 1976 album Tejas, which elaborated on the tour's artistic theme, was recorded during a break in the tour, and its songs were played in 1977. In 2008, Guitar World′s Alan di Perna called it "one of the most ambitious and bizarre tours in all of rock history".

== Background ==
ZZ Top's 1973 album Tres Hombres and supporting single "La Grange" brought them commercial and critical success in the United States. They gained a reputation as one of the top rock acts in the country and earned them the nickname "that little ol' band from Texas". On September 1, 1974, ZZ Top performed at Texas Memorial Stadium in Austin. The concert—photographs of which were used for their 1975 Fandango! album—was the last at the stadium until the Eagles performed there in 1995, as the artificial turf was damaged by rowdy fans. In 2008, guitarist and vocalist Billy Gibbons recalled the concert as a "great, great event".

== Design and production ==
The Worldwide Texas Tour stage was designed by Bill Narum, who also designed ZZ Top's album covers and tour posters. Whereas ZZ Top had previously used simple productions, the tour stage was an elaborate setup designed to "bring Texas to the people". It included a 63-by-48 foot (19-by-15 m) stage that was tilted at a four-degree angle, which resembled the shape of Texas and weighed 35 tons (70,000 lbs), costing a reported US$100,000. The stage was constructed in a seven-hour process with the help of 40 crew members. The set's backdrop was a 180-foot (55 m) three-dimensional panorama that used five scrims measuring 36-by-20 feet (11-by-6 m), which were hand-painted and individually lit to show dawn and dusk effects.

The presentation also included live animals such as a Texas Longhorn steer, a black buffalo (bison), two buzzards (turkey vultures), and two diamondback rattlesnakes, and plants such as yucca, agave, and cacti. Over US$140,000 was spent to ensure that the animals were healthy, traveling under the supervision of an animal expert and veterinarian. The set used 260 speakers and 130 light fixtures, using over 136,000 watts of power. A crew of 50 people traveled in a series of 13 vehicles to transport 75 tons (150,000 lbs) of equipment. The entire production and crew were insured for $10 million.

== Planning, itinerary, and ticketing ==
Rehearsals began in May 1976 at Astroarena in Houston. The band and crew spent a week rehearsing the show, constructing and adjusting the stage set. Unlike many of the group's previous tours, which began around the release of a new album, the Worldwide Texas Tour started over a year after Fandango! was released, allowing fans the opportunity to familiarize themselves with the songs. By opening night, the album had already been certified gold in the United States and sold over one million copies in Canada. The first leg of the tour, 30 shows in the US, alternated between stadiums and arenas. It didn't start off well as four days of heavy rain and hailstorms preceded the opening show at Groves Stadium, which decreased ticket sales to 20,000. Concerts in Europe, Japan, Australia, and Mexico were cancelled due to quarantine restrictions for buffalo.

The band's recorded their 1976 album Tejas after the second leg in the tour, and played its songs in 1977. By the time the third US leg began, Tejas had sold more than half a million copies in the US. The leg, which began in February 1977, was the band's first full arena leg of the tour. Tickets for two shows at The Summit in Houston sold out in less than twelve hours.

Ticket prices for outdoor venues were US$8.50 in advance and $10 on the day of the show, while indoor venues were $6 in advance and $7 at the door. At its conclusion, the Worldwide Texas Tour sold over 1.2 million tickets. In 2008, Guitar World′s Alan di Perna called it "one of the most ambitious and bizarre tours in all of rock history".

== Setlist ==
March 8, 1977: Binghamton, New York
1. "Thunderbird" (The Nightcaps cover)
2. "Chevrolet"
3. "Precious and Grace"
4. "Waitin' for the Bus"
5. "Jesus Just Left Chicago"
6. "Enjoy and Get It On"
7. "Pan Am Highway Blues"
8. "It's Only Love"
9. "Ten Dollar Man"
10. "Move Me on Down the Line"
11. "Heard It on the X"
12. "Arrested for Driving While Blind"
13. "Nasty Dogs and Funky Kings"
14. "She's a Heartbreaker"
15. "Beer Drinkers & Hell Raisers"
16. "Blue Jean Blues"
17. "Rattlesnake Shake" (Fleetwood Mac cover)
18. "La Grange" (contains excerpts of "Sloppy Drunk Blues" and "Bar-B-Q")
19. "Mexican Blackbird"
20. "Backdoor Love Affair"
21. "Tush"
22. "Goin' Down to Mexico"
23. "Backdoor Medley" (contains excerpts of "Backdoor Love Affair", Little Walter's "Mellow Down Easy", and "Long Distance Boogie")
24. "Shiek"
March 17, 1977: Boston, Massachusetts
1. "Thunderbird"
2. "Chevrolet"
3. "Precious and Grace"
4. "Waitin' for the Bus"
5. "Jesus Just Left Chicago"
6. "Enjoy and Get It On"
7. "Pan Am Highway Blues"
8. "Move Me on Down the Line"
9. "It's Only Love"
10. "Ten Dollar Man"
11. "Heard It on the X"
12. "Arrested for Driving While Blind"
13. "Balinese"
14. "Nasty Dogs and Funky Kings"
15. "She's a Heartbreaker"
16. "Beer Drinkers and Hell Raisers"
17. "Blue Jean Blues"
18. "Rattlesnake Shake"
19. "La Grange/Sloppy Drunk Blues/Bar-B-Q"
20. "Mexican Blackbird"
21. "El Diablo"
22. "Tush"
April 3, 1977: Birmingham, Alabama
1. "Thunderbird"
2. "Chevrolet"
3. "Precious and Grace"
4. "Waitin' for the Bus"
5. "Jesus Just Left Chicago"
6. "Enjoy and Get It On"
7. "Pan Am Highway Blues"
8. "Move Me on Down the Line"
9. "It's Only Love"
10. "Ten Dollar Man"
11. "Heard It on the X"
12. "Arrested for Driving While Blind"
13. "Balinese"
14. "Nasty Dogs and Funky Kings"
15. "She's a Heartbreaker"
16. "Beer Drinkers and Hell Raisers"
17. "Blue Jean Blues"
18. "Rattlesnake Shake"
19. "La Grange/Sloppy Drunk Blues/Bar-B-Q"
20. "Mexican Blackbird"
21. "El Diablo"
22. "Goin' Down to Mexico"
23. "Tush"
24. "Backdoor Medley"
December 30, 1977: San Antonio, Texas
1. "I Thank You"
2. "Neighbor, Neighbor"
3. "Precious and Grace"
4. "Waitin' for the Bus"
5. "Jesus Just Left Chicago"
6. "Down Brownie"
7. "Ko Ko Blues"
8. "It's Only Love"
9. "Ten Dollar Man"
10. "Heard It on the X"
11. "Arrested for Driving While Blind"
12. "Beer Drinkers and Hell Raisers"
13. "Blue Jean Blues"
14. "La Grange/Sloppy Drunk Blues/Bar-B-Q"
15. "Mexican Blackbird"
16. "Tush"

== Tour dates ==
List of concerts, showing date, city, country, venue, tickets sold, number of available tickets and amount of gross revenue
Date	City	Country	Venue	Opening Act(s)	Attendance	Revenue
Leg 1: arenas and stadiums in the United States
May 29, 1976	Winston-Salem	United States	Groves Stadium	Lynyrd Skynyrd, Point Blank	—N/a	—N/a
June 2, 1976	Norfolk	United States	Norfolk Scope	Wet Willie	8,309 / 12,000	—N/a
June 3, 1976	Richmond	United States	Richmond Coliseum		—N/a	—N/a
June 5, 1976	Atlanta	United States	Atlanta–Fulton County Stadium	Marshall Tucker Band, Elvin Bishop	45,000 / 65,000	$425,000
June 6, 1976	Knoxville	United States	Knoxville Civic Coliseum		—N/a	—N/a
June 7, 1976	Louisville	United States	Freedom Hall		—N/a	—N/a
June 12, 1976	Pittsburgh	United States	Three Rivers Stadium	Aerosmith, Point Blank	47,705 / 65,000	$425,000
June 20, 1976	Jacksonville	United States	Jacksonville Memorial Coliseum	Elvin Bishop, Jay Boy Adams	—N/a	—N/a
June 23, 1976	Niagara Falls	United States	Niagara Falls Convention Center	Blue Öyster Cult, Starz	—N/a	—N/a
June 24, 1976	Binghamton	United States	Broome County Veterans Memorial Arena		—N/a	—N/a
June 25, 1976	South Yarmouth	United States	Cape Cod Coliseum	Blue Öyster Cult, Starz	—N/a	—N/a
June 26, 1976	Philadelphia	United States	Philadelphia Spectrum	Blue Öyster Cult, Ted Nugent	18,209 / 19,500	$104,568
June 28, 1976	Richfield	United States	Coliseum at Richfield	Bob Seger & the Silver Bullet Band	—N/a	—N/a
June 29, 1976	Charleston	United States	Charleston Civic Center	Blue Öyster Cult	—N/a	—N/a
July 4, 1976	Memphis	United States	Liberty Bowl Memorial Stadium	Lynyrd Skynyrd, The Outlaws	32,000 / 60,000	$320,000
July 9, 1976	Omaha	United States	Omaha Civic Auditorium		—N/a	—N/a
July 11, 1976	Kansas City	United States	Arrowhead Stadium	Nitty Gritty Dirt Band, Jay Boy Adams	—N/a	—N/a
July 14, 1976	St. Louis	United States	Kiel Auditorium	Pure Prairie League, Jay Boy Adams	—N/a	—N/a
July 17, 1976	New Orleans	United States	Tulane Stadium	The J. Geils Band, Jay Boy Adams	51,000 / 60,000	$500,000
July 21, 1976	Duluth	United States	Duluth Arena Auditorium	The J. Geils Band, Jay Boy Adams	—N/a	—N/a
July 23, 1976	Milwaukee	United States	MECCA Arena	The J. Geils Band, Jay Boy Adams	—N/a	—N/a
July 25, 1976	South Bend	United States	Athletic & Convocation Center	The J. Geils Band, Jay Boy Adams	—N/a	—N/a
July 26, 1976	Clarkston	United States	Pine Knob Music Theatre	REO Speedwagon	—N/a	—N/a
July 27, 1976	Clarkston	United States	Pine Knob Music Theatre	REO Speedwagon	—N/a	—N/a
August 1, 1976	Denver	United States	McNichols Sports Arena	Blue Öyster Cult, The Outlaws	17,102 / 17,102	$136,816
August 4, 1976	Albuquerque	United States	Tingley Coliseum	Jay Boy Adams	—N/a	—N/a
August 7, 1976	Anaheim	United States	Anaheim Stadium	Blue Öyster Cult, Johnny & Edgar Winter	49,169 / 60,000	$498,040
August 9, 1976	San Diego	United States	San Diego Stadium	Blue Öyster Cult, Johnny & Edgar Winter	—N/a	—N/a
August 10, 1976	Fresno	United States	Selland Arena		—N/a	—N/a
August 14, 1976	Daly City	United States	Cow Palace	Ted Nugent	14,500 / 14,500	$79,844
Leg 2: arenas and stadiums in the United States
September 10, 1976	Waterloo	United States	McElroy Auditorium	The Boys	5,000 / 7,000	$24,900
September 11, 1976	Bloomington	United States	Metropolitan Sports Center	Pure Prairie League, Jay Boy Adams	—N/a	—N/a
September 12, 1976	Detroit	United States	Cobo Center		—N/a	—N/a
September 17, 1976	Bismarck	United States	Bismarck Civic Center	REO Speedwagon	4,200 / 8,000	—N/a
September 18, 1976	Billings	United States	Yellowstone METRA	REO Speedwagon	10,086 / 13,000	—N/a
September 19, 1976	Laramie	United States	War Memorial Fieldhouse	REO Speedwagon	—N/a	—N/a
September 21, 1976	Salt Lake City	United States	Salt Palace	Roadwork	—N/a	—N/a
September 22, 1976	Las Vegas	United States	Las Vegas Convention Center		—N/a	—N/a
September 24, 1976	Tucson	United States	Tucson Community Center		—N/a	—N/a
September 25, 1976	Nashville	United States	Tennessee State Fairgrounds	The Band, Cate Brothers	—N/a	$13,744
September 30, 1976	Lakeland	United States	Lakeland Civic Center	Point Blank	—N/a	—N/a
October 2, 1976	Hollywood	United States	Hollywood Sportatorium	Point Blank	—N/a	—N/a
October 9, 1976	Tallahassee	United States	Doak Campbell Stadium	Wet Willie, Point Blank	11,600 / 40,500	$82,000
October 14, 1976	Dayton	United States	University of Dayton Arena	Wet Willie	—N/a	—N/a
October 16, 1976	Charlotte	United States	Charlotte Coliseum	Styx	13,500 / 13,500	—N/a
October 17, 1976	Columbia	United States	Carolina Coliseum	Styx	—N/a	—N/a
October 21, 1976	Portland	United States	Portland Memorial Coliseum	Elvin Bishop	—N/a	—N/a
October 22, 1976	Spokane	United States	Spokane Coliseum	Elvin Bishop	6,506 / 8,500	—N/a
October 23, 1976	Seattle	United States	Seattle Center Coliseum	Elvin Bishop	—N/a	—N/a
October 28, 1976	Pocatello	United States	ASISU MiniDome		7,368 / 12,000	—N/a
October 31, 1976	Kansas City	United States	Kansas City Municipal Auditorium	Rory Gallagher	—N/a	—N/a
November 2, 1976	Oklahoma City	United States	Oklahoma State Fair Arena		—N/a	—N/a
November 4, 1976	Wichita	United States	Levitt Arena	The Fools	—N/a	—N/a
November 7, 1976	Evansville	United States	Roberts Municipal Stadium	The Fools	8,007 / 12,732	$51,686
November 9, 1976	Toledo	United States	Toledo Sports Arena	Montrose	—N/a	—N/a
November 11, 1976	Landover	United States	Capital Centre	Styx, Elvin Bishop	—N/a	—N/a
November 25, 1976	Houston	United States	The Summit	Rory Gallagher	—N/a	—N/a
November 26, 1976	Houston	United States	The Summit	Rory Gallagher	—N/a	—N/a
November 27, 1976	Fort Worth	United States	Tarrant County Convention Center	Rory Gallagher	—N/a	—N/a
November 28, 1976	Fort Worth	United States	Tarrant County Convention Center	Rory Gallagher	—N/a	—N/a
November 30, 1976	Tulsa	United States	Tulsa Assembly Center	Pure Prairie League	—N/a	—N/a
Leg 3: arenas and auditoriums in the United States
February 16, 1977	Madison	United States	Dane County Memorial Coliseum	Head East	—N/a	—N/a
February 17, 1977	Indianapolis	United States	Market Square Arena	Elvin Bishop	—N/a	—N/a
February 19, 1977	Chicago	United States	Chicago Stadium	Atlanta Rhythm Section	—N/a	—N/a
February 22, 1977	Fort Wayne	United States	Allen County War Memorial Coliseum		—N/a	—N/a
February 23, 1977	Cincinnati	United States	Riverfront Coliseum	Cate Brothers	11,951 / 17,556	$78,764
February 24, 1977	Detroit	United States	Cobo Center	Atlanta Rhythm Section	—N/a	—N/a
March 3, 1977	Portland	United States	Cumberland County Civic Center	The Blend	7,489 / 9,500	—N/a
March 8, 1977	Binghamton	United States	Broome County Veterans Memorial Arena	The Dictators	—N/a	—N/a
March 9, 1977	Springfield	United States	Springfield Civic Center	Bob Seger and the Silver Bullet Band	—N/a	—N/a
March 16, 1977	Boston	United States	Boston Garden	Santana	—N/a	—N/a
March 17, 1977	Boston	United States	Boston Garden	Santana	—N/a	—N/a
March 19, 1977	Jackson	United States	Mississippi Coliseum	Point Blank	—N/a	—N/a
March 23, 1977	Lake Charles	United States	Lake Charles Civic Center	Point Blank	—N/a	—N/a
March 25, 1977	Springfield	United States	Hammons Center Arena	Point Blank	—N/a	—N/a
March 26, 1977	Lincoln	United States	Pershing Auditorium	Styx	—N/a	—N/a
March 27, 1977	Normal	United States	Horton Fieldhouse	Point Blank	—N/a	—N/a
April 1, 1977	Savannah	United States	Savannah Civic Center	Point Blank	—N/a	—N/a
April 2, 1977	Mobile	United States	Mobile Municipal Auditorium	Point Blank	—N/a	—N/a
April 3, 1977	Birmingham	United States	Birmingham–Jefferson Civic Center	Point Blank	—N/a	—N/a
April 7, 1977	Richmond	United States	Richmond Coliseum	Nils Lofgren	—N/a	—N/a
April 8, 1977	Hampton	United States	Hampton Coliseum	Atlanta Rhythm Section, Nils Lofgren	—N/a	—N/a
April 9, 1977	Greensboro	United States	Greensboro Coliseum	Nils Lofgren	—N/a	—N/a
April 10, 1977	Roanoke	United States	Roanoke Civic Center	The Outlaws	—N/a	—N/a
April 13, 1977	Kalamazoo	United States	Wings Stadium	Rush	—N/a	—N/a
April 15, 1977	Johnson City	United States	Freedom Hall Civic Center	Blackfoot	5,688 / 8,500	$39,501
April 16, 1977	Clemson	United States	Littlejohn Coliseum		—N/a	—N/a
April 18, 1977	Columbia	United States	Hearnes Center		—N/a	—N/a
April 21, 1977	Rochester	United States	Rochester Community War Memorial	Pure Prairie League	—N/a	—N/a
April 23, 1977	Manchester	United States	John F. Kennedy Memorial Coliseum	The Dictators	—N/a	—N/a
April 24, 1977	Waterbury	United States	Palace Theater	Piper	3,800 / 3,800	$28,500
April 30, 1977	Providence	United States	Providence Civic Center	Foghat	—N/a	—N/a
May 6, 1977	Hays	United States	Gross Memorial Coliseum		—N/a	—N/a
May 7, 1977	Lawrence	United States	Allen Fieldhouse	Foreigner	—N/a	—N/a
Leg 4: arenas and auditoriums in the United States
June 7, 1977	Albuquerque	United States	Tingley Coliseum	Pure Prairie League, Climax Blues Band	—N/a	—N/a
June 8, 1977	Tucson	United States	Tucson Community Center	Pure Prairie League, Climax Blues Band	—N/a	—N/a
June 9, 1977	Tempe	United States	ASU Activity Center	Pure Prairie League, Climax Blues Band	—N/a	—N/a
June 11, 1977	Inglewood	United States	Inglewood Forum	Elvin Bishop	—N/a	—N/a
June 14, 1977	Bakersfield	United States	Bakersfield Civic Auditorium	Elvin Bishop	—N/a	—N/a
June 15, 1977	San Diego	United States	San Diego Sports Arena	Elvin Bishop	9,921 / 14,800	$65,768
June 18, 1977	El Paso	United States	El Paso County Coliseum	Point Blank	—N/a	—N/a
June 21, 1977	Fresno	United States	Selland Arena	Elvin Bishop	—N/a	—N/a
June 22, 1977	San Bernardino	United States	Swing Auditorium	Elvin Bishop	—N/a	—N/a
June 24, 1977	Daly City	United States	Cow Palace	Elvin Bishop	9,167 / 14,000	$62,039
July 1, 1977	Honolulu	United States	Neal S. Blaisdell Center	Yellow Rose Band	—N/a	—N/a
July 2, 1977	Honolulu	United States	Neal S. Blaisdell Center	Yellow Rose Band	—N/a	—N/a
July 9, 1977	Fargo	United States	North Dakota State University		—N/a	—N/a
July 10, 1977	Rapid City	United States	Rushmore Plaza Civic Center	Burton Cummings	—N/a	—N/a
Leg 5: arenas and auditoriums in the United States
December 28, 1977	Shreveport	United States	Hirsch Memorial Coliseum	Sea Level	—N/a	—N/a
December 29, 1977	Abilene	United States	Taylor County Expo Center	Muddy Waters, Jay Boy Adams	—N/a	—N/a
December 30, 1977	San Antonio	United States	San Antonio Convention Center	Muddy Waters, The Fools	—N/a	—N/a
December 31, 1977	Fort Worth	United States	Tarrant County Convention Center	Muddy Waters	—N/a	—N/a
January 1, 1978	Amarillo	United States	Amarillo Civic Center	Muddy Waters	—N/a	—N/a
