= Leila (song) =

Single by ZZ Top

from the album El Loco
- B-side: "Don't Tease Me"
- Released: 1981
- Recorded: 1981
- Length: 3:13
- Label: Warner Bros.
- Songwriters: Billy Gibbons, Dusty Hill, Frank Beard
- Producer: Bill Ham

ZZ Top singles chronology
"Cheap Sunglasses" (1980)	"Leila" (1981)	"Tube Snake Boogie" (1981)

"Leila" is a song by American rock band ZZ Top, from their 1981 album El Loco.

The song is a ballad with country and western influences and features Mark Erlewine on steel guitar.

Record World called it a "gorgeous ballad [that] highlights Billy Gibbons' Brian Wilson-ish falsetto vocal flights."

== Charts ==
Chart (1981)	Peak position
U.S. Billboard Hot 100	77

== Personnel ==
- Billy Gibbons: guitar, steel guitar, vocals
- Dusty Hill: bass
- Frank Beard: drums
- Mark Erlewine: pedal steel
