= Cheap Sunglasses =

Single by ZZ Top

from the album Degüello
- B-side: "Esther Be the One"
- Released: 1979
- Recorded: 1979
- Genre: Blues rock; Southern rock; boogie rock
- Length: 4:48 (album version); 2:40 (single version)
- Label: Warner Bros.
- Songwriters: Billy Gibbons; Dusty Hill; Frank Beard
- Producer: Bill Ham

ZZ Top singles chronology
"I Thank You" (1979)	"Cheap Sunglasses" (1979)	"Leila" (1981)

"Cheap Sunglasses" is a song by the American rock band ZZ Top. It was released as the second single from their 1979 studio album Degüello.

== Overview ==
The song captures many of the sounds and beats for which ZZ Top is famous.

In a Guitar World article, lead guitarist Billy Gibbons said that he used a Marshall Major amplifier and a Maestro ring modulator on this song, and that the amplifier had a blown tube during recording which added to the tonal character of the song. The Marshall Major is a slightly taller, 200-watt version of the classic Marshall 100-watt head.

== Release ==
The regular b-side for the "Cheap Sunglasses" single was the Degüello album track "Esther Be The One". The promo single included the live version of "Cheap Sunglasses" instead. This version was included on Chrome, Smoke & BBQ box set its compilation counterpart Rancho Texicano: The Very Best of ZZ Top.

== Reception ==
Cash Box called it "smoldering, blues-rock" with humorous lyrics. Record World said that it "offers wry wit and earthy rock riffs."

== Charts ==
Chart (1980)	Peak position
U.S. Billboard Hot 100	89

== Cover versions and samples ==
The rap duo EPMD sampled "Cheap Sunglasses" on their song "You're a Customer" (which appears on their 1988 debut album Strictly Business).

Kid Rock samples it on his song "Cramp Ya Style" for his 1990 debut Grits Sandwiches for Breakfast.

Midwest rap artist Esham sampled the song in his production for the song "Nine Dead Bodies" of his 1992 double album Judgement Day.

The Warren Brothers covered the song on the 2002 compilation album Sharp Dressed Men: A Tribute to ZZ Top.

Wolfmother covered the song on the 2011 tribute album, ZZ Top: A Tribute from Friends.

The Sword covered the song on the deluxe version of their 2012 album Apocryphon.

Apathy covered the song on his 2007 mixtape album Baptism by Fire.

== Personnel ==
- Billy Gibbons – vocals, lead and rhythm guitars
- Dusty Hill – bass, keyboards
- Frank Beard – drums
