= Francine (song) =

"Francene"
- German release picture sleeve

Single by ZZ Top

from the album Rio Grande Mud
- B-side: "Francene (Spanish)"
- Released: 1972
- Recorded: Brian Studios; Ardent Studios; Memphis, Tennessee
- Genre: Rock
- Length: 3:33
- Label: London
- Songwriters: Billy Gibbons, Steve Perron; Kenny Cordray
- Producer: Bill Ham

ZZ Top singles chronology
"(Somebody Else Been) Shakin' Your Tree" (1971)	"Francene" (1972)	"La Grange" (1973)

Official audio
- "Francene" on YouTube

"Francine" is a song recorded by the American rock band ZZ Top from their 1972 album Rio Grande Mud. It was their first chart hit.

== Overview ==
"Francine" was the only single released from the Rio Grande Mud album and gave ZZ Top their first bona fide hit reaching number 69 and 81 on the US Billboard Hot 100 and US Cash Box Top 100, respectively. ZZ Top co-wrote the song with Steve Perron and Kenny Cordray, but the band claimed sole writing credit, cutting the two collaborators out of royalties for years.

Various official ZZ Top releases throughout the years, beginning in 1972, have used the alternative spelling "Francene", especially on the various single releases, both within and outside the United States.

The B-side of the single was a Spanish version of the song. It was later included on the box set Chrome, Smoke & BBQ.

== Personnel ==
- Frank Beard – drums
- Billy Gibbons – guitar, lead vocals
- Dusty Hill – bass guitar, backing vocals
