= Sharp Dressed Man =

Single by ZZ Top

Single by ZZ Top

from the album Eliminator
- B-side: "I Got the Six"
- Released: July 1983
- Recorded: 1982
- Genre: Blues rock; synth-pop; Southern rock; electronic rock; boogie rock; pop rock; new wave
- Length: 4:13 (album version); 3:01 (single edit)
- Label: Warner Bros.
- Songwriters: Billy Gibbons; Dusty Hill; Frank Beard
- Producer: Bill Ham

ZZ Top singles chronology
"Gimme All Your Lovin'" (1983)	"Sharp Dressed Man" (1983)	"TV Dinners" (1983)

"Sharp Dressed Man" is a song by American rock band ZZ Top, released on their 1983 album Eliminator. The song was produced by band manager Bill Ham, and recorded and mixed by Terry Manning. Pre-production recording engineer Linden Hudson was very involved in the early stages of this song's production.

== Composition ==
The guitar solo in the song was chosen by Guitar World as number 43 in their 2009 list of the 50 Greatest Guitar Solos.

== Appearances ==
At 2007's VH1 Rock Honors, Nickelback covered the song as a tribute (Billy Gibbons had earlier made a guest appearance on Nickelback's own songs "Rockstar" and "Follow You Home").

ZZ Top played this song at halftime of the 2008 Orange Bowl college football bowl game.

In 2020, the song reentered the Billboard charts following the release of the documentary ZZ Top: That Little Ol' Band from Texas.

== Music video ==
The "Sharp Dressed Man" music video continues the story of the "Gimme All Your Lovin'" video, and forms a loose trilogy ending with the video for "Legs". In the video, a male parking valet is remade as a star by a trio of women driving up in the Eliminator car; the band grants him the keys to the car.

The video was directed by Tim Newman, who had also directed the video for "Gimme All Your Lovin'". Warner Bros. Records record executive Jeff Ayeroff said that Warner did not want to do a second video, but he convinced them to pay more money for the "Sharp Dressed Man" video. Newman said, "When they asked me to do another one, the idea that you would do a sequel in a form that isn't even a form struck me as funny, in a very insidery way." He said that a beer company, likely Schlitz, secretly paid Warner Bros. for a product placement in the video, but MTV refused to air it until the shots were removed. After this damaged his reputation, Newman told Warner he would no longer direct their videos. After negotiating, he returned to direct the video for "Legs".

== Charts ==
Chart (1983–1985)	Peak position
Australian Kent Music Report	66
Belgian VRT Top 30	15
Dutch Singles Chart	9
Irish Singles Chart	8
U.K. Singles Chart	22
U.S. Billboard Hot 100	56
U.S. Billboard Mainstream Rock Tracks	8

Chart (2020)	Peak position
US Hot Rock & Alternative Songs (Billboard)	14

Chart (2021)	Peak position
Hungary (Single Top 40)	30

2025 weekly chart performance
Chart (2025)	Peak position
Finland Airplay (Radiosoittolista)	95

2026 weekly chart performance
Chart (2026)	Peak position
Finland Airplay (Radiosoittolista)	84

=== Year-end charts ===
Chart (1985)	Position
Dutch Top 40	81

== Certifications ==
Region	Certification	Certified units/sales
Denmark (IFPI Danmark)	Gold	45,000^{‡}
Germany (BVMI)	Gold	300,000^{‡}
New Zealand (RMNZ)	2× Platinum	60,000^{‡}
Spain (Promusicae)	Gold	30,000^{‡}
United Kingdom (BPI) with "I Got the Six"	Platinum	600,000^{‡}
^{‡} Sales+streaming figures based on certification alone.

== Personnel ==
- Billy Gibbons – keyboard, synthesizer, guitar, harmonica, lead vocals, producer, arrangement
- Dusty Hill – bass guitar (uncertain), backing vocals
- Linden Hudson – bass synthesizer, sound engineer, producer, arrangement
- Terry Manning – keyboard, synthesizer, drum machine, backing vocals, sound engineer, producer, arrangement
- Jimi Jamison – backing vocals
- Bill Ham – producer
- Bob Ludwig – mastering engineer
