= I Thank You (song) =

1968 single by Sam & Dave

Single by Sam & Dave

from the album I Thank You
- B-side: "Wrap It Up"
- Released: January 8, 1968
- Recorded: 1967
- Genre: Soul
- Length: 2:44
- Label: Stax/Atlantic; S-242
- Songwriters: Isaac Hayes; David Porter
- Producers: Isaac Hayes; David Porter

Sam & Dave singles chronology
"Soul Man" (1967)	"I Thank You" (1968)	"You Don't Know What You Mean to Me" (1968)

"I Thank You" is a song written by David Porter and Isaac Hayes originally recorded by Sam & Dave, released in early 1968. The single was Sam & Dave's final release on Stax Records, reaching No. 9 on the Billboard Pop singles chart and No. 4 on the R&B chart.

Shortly after its release, Stax severed its distribution deal with Atlantic Records and Sam & Dave, who were actually signed to Atlantic and loaned out to Stax and began recording for Atlantic proper. The song begins with Sam's spoken introduction that goes: "I want everybody to get off your seat,/ And get your arms together,/ And your hands together,/ And give me some of that old soul clapping". First, Sam sings the refrain, plus the first verse, and the refrain, while Dave sings the second verse, the refrain, and the third verse, with both Sam and Dave sharing on the repeated "Thank Yous" portion. Following a brief instrumental, Sam sings the refrain, with Dave, joining him, on the Coda with the repeated "thank yous".

== Personnel ==
- Vocals by Sam Moore and Dave Prater
- Instrumentation by Booker T. & the M.G.'s and the Mar-Keys horns

== ZZ Top version ==
"I Thank You"

Single by ZZ Top

from the album Degüello
- B-side: "A Fool for Your Stockings"
- Released: 1979
- Recorded: 1979
- Genre: Blues rock
- Length: 3:23
- Label: Warner Bros.
- Songwriters: Isaac Hayes; David Porter
- Producer: Bill Ham

ZZ Top singles chronology
"Enjoy and Get It On" (1977)	"I Thank You" (1979)	"Cheap Sunglasses" (1979)

The American rock band ZZ Top covered the song on their 1979 album Degüello. The band released the song as a single the next year, and it reached No. 34 on the US Billboard Hot 100 becoming the band's second top 40 hit (after "Tush", five years earlier).

Record World said that "Billy Gibbons growls with soulful authority and matches his stellar vocal work with a stinging guitar." Record Mirror dismissed the song as "just growly, lazy, fiddly, and very boring laid-back rock".

== Other versions ==
- Bonnie Raitt covered the song on her album The Glow in 1979.
- Phil Vassar released a country version of the song in 2002 for the album Sharp Dressed Men: A Tribute to ZZ Top.
- John Farnham also released a cover on his album 33⅓.
- Paul Shaffer and the CBS Orchestra commonly played this song between commercial breaks on the Late Show with David Letterman.
- Australian band The Casanovas recorded a version for their second album All Night Long. It is generally considered to be in recognition of former Australian act The Powder Monkeys who used to regularly play the song live and were a significant influence on the group.
- In April 2009 Tower of Power released Great American Soulbook featuring personal favorite cover songs of the band. Blending soul, funk, jazz, Tower of Power funkified each tune including their version of "I Thank You". Sam Moore sang on "Mr. Pitiful" while Tom Jones guested on "I Thank You".
- Bon Jovi covered the song which appeared on a special 2-disc version of their album These Days.
- Classic rock singer Paul Rodgers included his version of the song on his 2014 cover album of soul classics The Royal Sessions.
- Robert Randolph and the Family Band cover the song on the 2017 album Got Soul with the help of Cory Henry.
- Tom Jones covered the song in 1970 on his album Tom.
- The European candy company Storck has used the song in American television advertisements for their Merci chocolates, with the lyrics being paraphrased to convey the singer giving thanks to the recipient of the candy for various things they had done.
- The song features in the 2017 film A Dog's Purpose.
- Sam Moore's spoken introduction is adapted by the British ska band Symarip in the introduction to their 1970 hit single "Skinhead Moonstomp".
- A version of the song appears on The Commitments, Vol. 2: Music from the Original Motion Picture Soundtrack performed by the film's eponymous band.
- Carl Wilson of The Beach Boys performed the song live on several occasions during his solo performances.

== Charts ==
Chart (1968)	Peak position
UK Singles (Official Charts)	34
US Billboard Hot 100	9
US Hot Rhythm & Blues Singles (Billboard)	4
US Cash Box Top 100	8
