= Gimme All Your Lovin' =

1983 single by ZZ Top

Single by ZZ Top

from the album Eliminator
- B-side: "If I Could Only Flag Her Down"
- Released: April 26, 1983
- Genre: Hard rock; electronic rock; boogie rock; pop rock; new wave
- Length: 3:59 (album version); 3:24 (edited version)
- Label: Warner Bros.
- Songwriters: Billy Gibbons; Dusty Hill; Frank Beard
- Producer: Bill Ham

ZZ Top singles chronology
"Tube Snake Boogie" (1981)	"Gimme All Your Lovin'" (1983)	"Sharp Dressed Man" (1983)

Official video
- "Gimme All Your Lovin'" on YouTube

"Gimme All Your Lovin'" is a song by American rock band ZZ Top from their 1983 album Eliminator. It was released as the album's first single in early 1983. The single reached No. 37 on the US Billboard Hot 100 chart, and reached No. 10 on the UK Singles Chart. It ties with the band's 1992 cover of Elvis Presley's "Viva Las Vegas" as their highest-charting single in the UK. The song was produced by band manager Bill Ham, and recorded and mixed by Terry Manning.

== Music video ==
The "Gimme All Your Lovin'" music video follows a young male gas station attendant who is taken for a ride by a trio of women driving the vintage Eliminator hot rod (1933 Ford). The band appears and disappears, and they throw the attendant the keys to the car. The three main actresses were Jeana Tomasino from Wisconsin, Danièle Arnaud from Nice, France, and a third model Kymberly Herrin who dropped out of contact and was not paid. Tomasino had posed for Playboy in 1980.

Record executive Jeff Ayeroff saw how MTV was reshaping popular music throughout 1982. After he joined Warner Bros. Records in early 1983, he convinced them to pay for the first ZZ Top music video, for "Gimme All Your Lovin'". Warner hired filmmaker Tim Newman to direct it. Newman's siblings David, Thomas and Maria scored orchestral music, and his cousin was songwriter Randy Newman. Tim Newman met with Ham and the band to discuss ideas for the video. He returned to direct the videos for "Sharp Dressed Man" and "Legs".

== Gimme All Your Lovin' 2000 ==
"Gimme All Your Lovin' 2000"

Single by Martay feat. ZZ Top
- Released: 1999
- Length: 2:54
- Label: Riverhorse Records
- Songwriters: Billy Gibbons; Dusty Hill; Frank Beard

Martay singles chronology
"Gimme All Your Lovin' 2000" (1999)	"Take You There" (2000)

A cover by Martay featuring ZZ Top, called "Gimme All Your Lovin' 2000", charted in Top 40 in several European countries in 1999 including number 28 in the UK.

== Other versions ==
- Kym Mazelle and Jocelyn Brown's 1994 rendition, which utilized a sample from C+C Music Factory's "Deeper Love", reached number 22 in the UK Singles Chart.
- In 1993 a Finnish band Leningrad Cowboys recorded on the Helsinki Senate Square a live cover version of this song featuring Red Army Choir, with a bit of the National Anthem of the Soviet Union making its way into the arrangement, along with choruses of Hallelujah as well.
- Lonestar released a version of the song in 2002 for the album Sharp Dressed Men: A Tribute to ZZ Top.
- In 2011, American band Filter covered the song for the tribute album ZZ Top: A Tribute from Friends.

== Charts ==
=== Weekly charts ===
==== ZZ Top ====
Chart (1983–1985)	Peak position
Australia (Kent Music Report)	82
Belgium (Ultratop 50 Flanders)	11
Canada Top Singles (RPM)	39
France (IFOP)	19
Ireland (IRMA)	9
Netherlands (Dutch Top 40)	8
Netherlands (Single Top 100)	3
UK Singles (Official Charts)	10
US Billboard Hot 100	37
US Top Tracks (Billboard)	2
US Cash Box Top 100	43

==== Jocelyn Brown & Kym Mazelle ====
Chart (1994)	Peak position
Scotland (OCC)	19
UK Singles (OCC)	22
UK Dance (OCC)	9
UK Club Chart (Music Week)	12

==== Martay feat. ZZ Top ====
Chart (1999)	Peak position
Belgium (Ultratip Bubbling Under Flanders)	6
Germany (GfK)	39
Switzerland (Schweizer Hitparade)	33
UK Singles (Official Charts)	28

=== Year-end charts ===
==== ZZ Top ====
Chart (1985)	Rank
Belgium (Ultratop 50 Flanders)	76
Netherlands (Dutch Top 40)	56
Netherlands (Single Top 100)	52

== Certifications ==
Region	Certification	Certified units/sales
France (SNEP)	Gold	100,000^{‡}
New Zealand (RMNZ)	Platinum	30,000^{‡}
United Kingdom (BPI)	Gold	400,000^{‡}
^{‡} Sales+streaming figures based on certification alone.
