= Degüello =

Studio album by ZZ Top
- Released: November 1979
- Recorded: April–August 1979
- Genres: Blues; boogie rock
- Length: 33:54
- Label: Warner Bros.
- Producer: Bill Ham

ZZ Top chronology
The Best of ZZ Top (1977)	Degüello (1979)	El Loco (1981)

Singles from Degüello
- 1. "I Thank You" Released: 1979; 2. "Cheap Sunglasses" Released: 1979

Degüello (/dɛˈɡweɪoʊ/ de-GWAY-oh) is the sixth studio album by the American rock band ZZ Top, released in November 1979. It was the first ZZ Top release on Warner Bros. Records and eventually went platinum. It was produced by Bill Ham, recorded and mixed by Terry Manning, and mastered by Bob Ludwig.

Returning from a two-year hiatus, the band began to showcase the influence they had collected during the time away; Gibbons' time in Europe introduced him to punk music, the influences of which seeped into the creation of the album. The band also consciously tried experimenting with technology: Gibbons saw an episode of The Phil Donahue Show where a person's identity was protected using silhouette and a pitch shifter; liking the sound, he asked engineer Manning to call the show and find out what the effects unit was. Manning eventually convinced a reluctant show producer to reveal it, and the effect was used for both vocals and guitars on songs like "Manic Mechanic".

The album marked the first time that ZZ Top featured cover versions on a studio album: "I Thank You" by Isaac Hayes/David Porter and "Dust My Broom", credited on early editions to Elmore James but subsequently credited to Robert Johnson who recorded it in 1936. Elmore James had adapted and popularized the song in 1951.

The song "Hi Fi Mama" was later featured on the episode "The Twist in the Twister" of the TV series Bones, where Gibbons also guest starred.

== Meaning of the title ==
"Degüello" means "slashing of the throat" in Spanish; idiomatically, when something is said to be done "a degüello", it means "no quarter" in Spanish (as in, "no surrender to be given or accepted—a fight to the death"). It was also the title of a Moorish-origin bugle call used by the Mexican Army at the Battle of the Alamo in 1836.

== Critical reception ==
Professional ratings
Review scores
Source	Rating
AllMusic	4.5/5 stars
Christgau's Record Guide	A−
The Rolling Stone Album Guide	4/5 stars
Smash Hits	8/10
Tom Hull	A

The Boston Globe noted that "the extended layoff has taken some of the edge off Gibbons' lead vocals and the album lacks a killer cut... On the plus side is ZZ Top's shuffling guitar-bass-drums attack, which is as hard and funky as ever."

== Track listing ==
All tracks are written by Billy Gibbons, Dusty Hill, and Frank Beard, except where noted.

Side one
No.	Title	Writer(s)	Length
1.	"I Thank You"	Isaac Hayes; David Porter	3:22
2.	"She Loves My Automobile"		2:22
3.	"I'm Bad, I'm Nationwide"		4:45
4.	"A Fool for Your Stockings"		4:15
5.	"Manic Mechanic"		2:36

Side two
No.	Title	Writer(s)	Length
1.	"Dust My Broom"	Robert Johnson	3:06
2.	"Lowdown in the Street"		2:49
3.	"Hi Fi Mama"		2:22
4.	"Cheap Sunglasses"		4:46
5.	"Esther Be the One"		3:30

Original LP pressings of Degüello credited authorship of "Dust My Broom" to Elmore James.

== Personnel ==
- Billy Gibbons – guitar, vocals, baritone saxophone
- Dusty Hill – bass guitar, keyboards, backing vocals, lead vocal on "Hi Fi Mama", tenor saxophone
- Frank Beard – drums, percussion, alto saxophone

== Production ==
- Producer – Bill Ham
- Engineer – Terry Manning
- Mastering engineer – Bob Ludwig

== Charts ==
Chart (1979–1980)	Peak position
Australian Albums (Kent Music Report)	100
Austrian Albums (Ö3 Austria)	19
Canada Top Albums/CDs (RPM)	5
US Billboard 200	24

== Certifications ==
Region	Certification	Certified units/sales
Canada (Music Canada)	Platinum	100,000^{^}
Germany (BVMI)	Gold	250,000^{^}
United States (RIAA)	Platinum	1,000,000^{^}
^{^} Shipments figures based on certification alone.

== Charting Singles ==
Single	Peak chart positions	
Single	US	CAN
"I Thank You"	34	52
"Cheap Sunglasses"	89	—
