= Kenny Cordray =

American musician and songwriter (1954–2017)

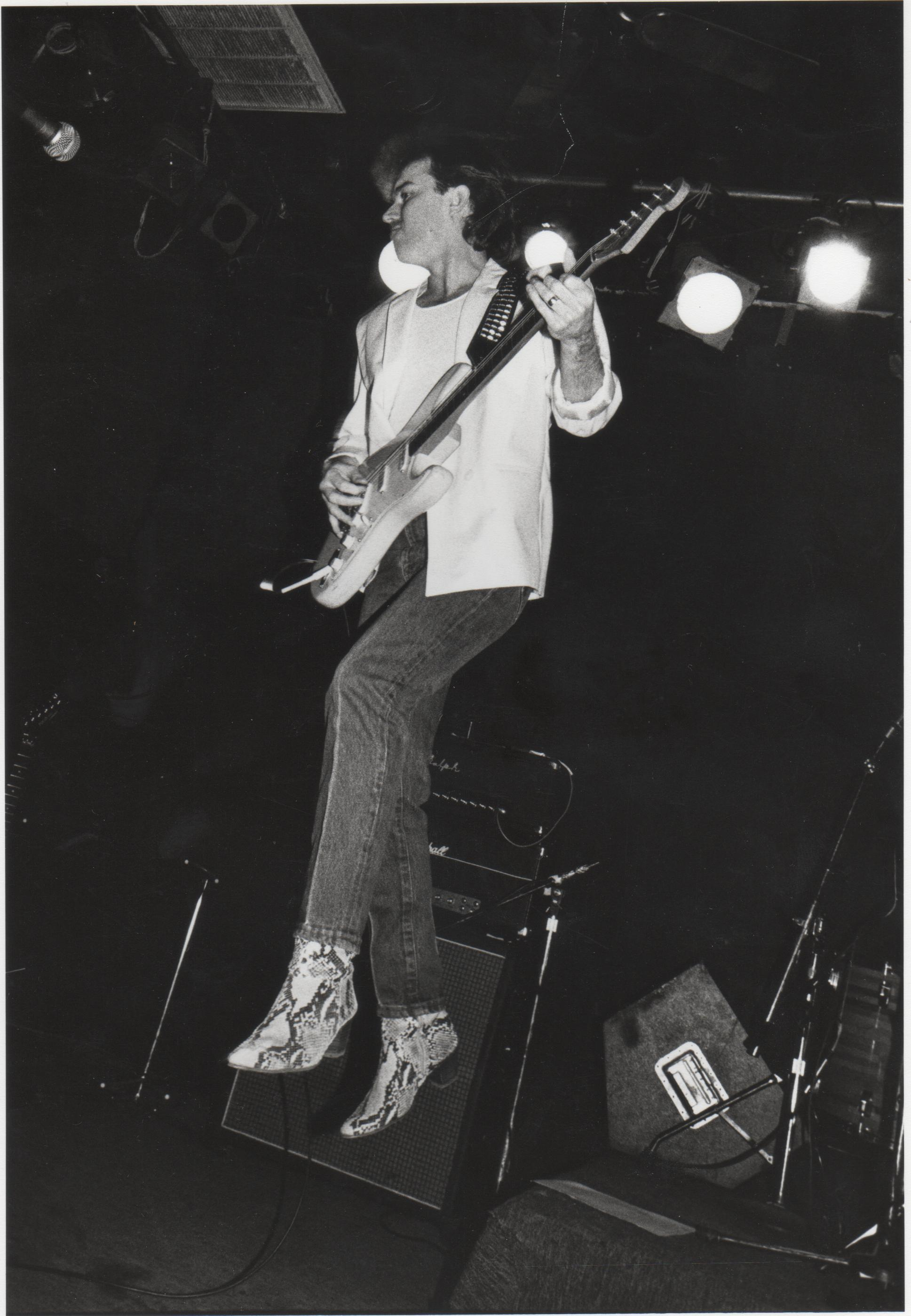

Background information
- Born: Kenneth Cordray; July 21, 1954; Texarkana, Texas
- Died: May 21, 2017 (aged 62) Nassau Bay, Texas
- Genres: Rock, hard rock, instrumental rock, blues rock
- Occupations: Musician, songwriter, producer, guitar instructor
- Instruments: Guitar, bass guitar, keyboards, vocals
- Years active: 1957–2017
- Website: kennycordray.com

Kenneth Cordray (July 21, 1954 – May 21, 2017) was an American guitarist and songwriter, who shared the stage with notable musicians and performers such as John Mayall, John Lee Hooker and Billy Gibbons of ZZ Top. Cordray became the lead guitarist for The Children under the ATCO label and later on ODE records produced by Lou Adler. He co-wrote the song "Francine", which peaked at 69 on the Billboard Hot 100, with Steve Perron for ZZ Top's album Rio Grande Mud.

Cordray performed and wrote music with Jaco Pastorius and played in Wayne Cochran and the C.C. Rider band at Pastorius' request. While playing with the C.C. Riders, Cordray backed up Jerry Lee Lewis on an episode of the Midnight Special and in concert.

He moved to New Orleans to play with the former C.C. Riders and Edgar Winter's White Trash band members before forming his own group, Cordray. Members included Clay Hemphill, David Lee Watson, Allyn Robinson and Mark Campbell. Cordray's first national break came on January 6, 1986, in USA Today when he was playing lead guitar with Herschel Berry and the Natives. They were extremely popular in Texas and Louisiana. Kenny played with them from 1981 through 1986. He did some sporadic gigs with Berry throughout the 1990’s.

In 1991, Cordray formed The Civilians and recorded a CD entitled Miracles. In late 1992, Cordray, Dave Foster and Todd Harrison formed a "Texas rockin' blues psychedelic power trio", calling themselves Kenny Cordray and Blue Science.

In March 2012, he released It Takes Everything with his band called Love Street. The core rhythm section for the album consists of Mark Andes on bass guitar, Tyson Sheth on drums, Paul English on keyboards and Cordray on guitars. When the album was released, the Houston Chronicle called Cordray "one of Houston’s greatest guitarists".

In November 2014, Cordray released his final work, C-R-C, as a part of the power trio C-R-C, Cordray-Robinson-Campbell, featuring Mark Campbell and Allyn Robinson.

Cordray gave guitar lessons to children and adults for many years. He also ran Rock Camp Live, a summer music camp for aspiring 10-18 year-old musicians in the Houston/Galveston Bay Area.

== Death and legacy ==
Cordray was killed by his son on May 21, 2017, in an apparent murder-suicide.

He is mentioned in the book, Boys From Houston: The spirit and image of our music.
