= Fandango! =

1975 studio & live album by ZZ Top

Studio album (with live tracks) by ZZ Top
- Released: April 18, 1975
- Recorded: April 12, 1974 (tracks 1–3) December 30, 1974 – March 23, 1975
- Genres: Blues rock; Southern rock; boogie rock; hard rock
- Length: 33:33
- Label: London
- Producer: Bill Ham

ZZ Top chronology
Tres Hombres (1973)	Fandango! (1975)	Tejas (1976)

Singles from Fandango!
- 1. "Tush" Released: May 1975; 2. "Heard It on the X" Released: 1978 (Japan)

Professional ratings
Review scores
Source	Rating
AllMusic	3.5/5 stars
Classic Rock	3.5/5 stars
Rolling Stone	(not rated)
The Rolling Stone Album Guide	2.5/5 stars

Fandango! is the fourth album by the American rock band ZZ Top, released on 18 April 1975. The album's first side consists of selections from live shows, with the second side being new studio recordings. A remastered and expanded edition of this album was released on February 28, 2006.

== Album title ==
Fandango, from which the album gets its name, is a type of dance similar to flamenco.

== Background ==
Frontman Billy Gibbons said of the album:

The live capture wound up being in the can first. We had enough live material to make up one side of the disc, so we decided to go with the unusual move of making the album half live, half studio. It turned out to be a winning combination for us.

The album's opening song, "Thunderbird", despite having ZZ Top writing credit, was originally written and performed by The Nightcaps, a band formed in the 1950s when its members were teenagers. The Nightcaps performed the song and distributed it on their album Wine, Wine, Wine but never applied for copyright. ZZ Top began performing the song as early as 1974, and has conceded that their version is lyrically and musically identical to the Nightcaps' song. The Nightcaps sued ZZ Top for copyright infringement but their claims were dismissed as ZZ Top had registered a copyright on the song in 1975.

The song "Heard It on the X" was written about the influence of a Mexican border blaster radio station, X-Rock 80. The station was located in El Paso, Texas, while the transmitter was across the border in Juárez, Mexico. That allowed it to put out 150,000 watts of power from 5 p.m. to 6 a.m. Mountain Time. It could be heard in up to 44 states and parts of Canada.

== Promotion and release ==
The only single released from the album was "Tush". The single peaked at #20 on the US Billboard Hot 100, making it the band's first top 40 single in the US. The song "Heard It on the X" also received heavy rotation on classic rock radio.

In the late 1980s the album was released on CD with the studio recordings being digitally remixed and the original 1975 mix version was discontinued. The remix version created controversy among fans because it significantly changed the sound of the instruments, especially the drums. The remix version was used on all early CD copies and was the only version available for over 20 years.

A remastered and expanded edition of the album was released on February 28, 2006, containing three bonus live tracks. The 2006 edition is the first CD version to use Terry Manning's original 1975 mix.

The album was re-released in 2009 on 180-gram vinyl using the original master tapes. It appears exactly the same except that it had a 180-gram vinyl LP sticker from Back to Vinyl records.

== Track listing ==
All tracks are written by Billy Gibbons, Dusty Hill, and Frank Beard except where noted.

Side one
No.	Title	Writer(s)	Lead vocals	Length
1.	"Thunderbird" (Live)		Gibbons	4:10
2.	"Jailhouse Rock" (Live)	Jerry Leiber, Mike Stoller	Hill	2:01
3.	"Backdoor Medley" (Live): "Backdoor Love Affair"; "Mellow Down Easy"; "Backdoor Love Affair No. 2"; "Long Distance Boogie"	Gibbons, Bill Ham; Willie Dixon; Gibbons; John Lee Hooker	Gibbons, Hill	9:45: 0:40; 4:03; 2:00; 3:02

Side two
No.	Title	Lead vocals	Length
4.	"Nasty Dogs and Funky Kings"	Gibbons	2:37
5.	"Blue Jean Blues"	Gibbons	4:42
6.	"Balinese"	Hill	2:37
7.	"Mexican Blackbird"	Gibbons	3:04
8.	"Heard It on the X"	Gibbons, Hill	2:23
9.	"Tush"	Hill	2:14

2006 remastered version bonus tracks
No.	Title	Writer(s)	Lead vocals	Length
10.	"Heard it on the X" (Live)		Gibbons, Hill	2:36
11.	"Jailhouse Rock" (Live)	Leiber, Stoller	Hill	1:52
12.	"Tush" (Live)		Hill	3:42

- Tracks 1–3 (side A of the original LP) were recorded live at the Warehouse in New Orleans on April 12, 1974, "captured as it came down – hot, spontaneous and presented to you honestly, without the assistance of studio gimmicks".
- Tracks 4–9 (side B) were new studio recordings.
- Tracks 10–12 (of the expanded 2006 version) were recorded live at the Capitol Theatre in Passaic, New Jersey, on August 30, 1980.

== Personnel ==
ZZ Top

- Billy Gibbons – guitar, vocals
- Dusty Hill – bass, backing vocals, lead vocals on "Jailhouse Rock", "Balinese", and on "Tush"
- Frank Beard – drums, percussion

Production

- Producer – Bill Ham
- Engineers – Jim Reeves, John L. Venable, and, Norman Mershon for Record Plant Truck. Robin Brians, Terry Kane, Bob Ludwig (mastering), Terry Manning
- Album concept – Bill Ham
- Design – Bill Narum
- Photography – John Dekalb

== Charts ==
Chart (1975–2006)	Peak position
Australian Albums (Kent Music Report)	61
Canada Top Albums/CDs (RPM)	1
UK Albums (Official Charts)	60
US Billboard 200	10

== Certifications ==
Region	Certification	Certified units/sales
Canada (Music Canada)	Platinum	100,000^{^}
United States (RIAA)	Gold	500,000^{^}
^{^} Shipments figures based on certification alone.
