= La Grange (song) =

1973 song by ZZ Top

- French 7" single

Single by ZZ Top

from the album Tres Hombres
- B-side: "Just Got Paid"
- Released: January 1974
- Studio: Brian & Ardent, Memphis, Tennessee
- Genre: Blues rock; boogie rock; Southern rock
- Length: 3:51
- Label: London
- Songwriters: Billy Gibbons; Dusty Hill; Frank Beard
- Producer: Bill Ham

ZZ Top singles chronology
"Francene" (1972)	"La Grange" (1974)	"Beer Drinkers & Hell Raisers" (1974)

Official audio
- "La Grange" on YouTube

"La Grange" is a song by the American rock group ZZ Top, from their 1973 album Tres Hombres. One of ZZ Top's most successful songs, it was released as a single in January 1974 and received extensive radio play, rising to No. 41 on the Billboard Hot 100 in June 1974. The song’s title and lyrics refer to a brothel on the outskirts of La Grange, Fayette County, Texas (later called the "Chicken Ranch"). The brothel is also the subject of the Broadway play and film The Best Little Whorehouse in Texas.

In March 2020 the song re-entered the Billboard charts following the release of the documentary ZZ Top: That Little Ol' Band from Texas.

== Composition ==
The initial groove of the song is based on a traditional boogie blues rhythm used by John Lee Hooker in "Boogie Chillen' ". In 1992, Bernard Besman, a music publisher who worked with Hooker and had a songwriting co-credit on "Boogie Chillen'", filed a lawsuit against the members of ZZ Top, alleging that "La Grange" infringed on "Boogie Chillen'". A federal judge dismissed the case in 1995, declaring "Boogie Chillen'" was in the public domain.

== Background ==
The single's B-side, "Just Got Paid", is from the band's second album, Rio Grande Mud.

The song was produced by Bill Ham.

== Reception ==
Cash Box called it a "hard driving delight certain to satisfy those fans of heavy blues."

In March 2005, Q placed "La Grange" at 92nd of the 100 Greatest Guitar Tracks. The song is also ranked No. 74 on Rolling Stone magazine's 100 Greatest Guitar Songs of All Time. Rolling Stone called the song, "...a standard for guitarists to show off their chops."

== Personnel ==
- Billy Gibbons – vocals, lead and rhythm guitar
- Dusty Hill – bass guitar
- Frank Beard – drums, percussion

== Charts ==
Chart (1974)	Peak position
Australia (Go-Set National Top 40)	15
Australia (Kent Music Report)	21
Canada Top Singles (RPM)	34
France (IFOP)	58
US Billboard Hot 100	41
US Cash Box	24
US Record World	33

Chart (2020)	Peak position
US Hot Rock & Alternative Songs (Billboard)	12

== Certifications ==
Region	Certification	Certified units/sales
France (SNEP) 2005 remaster	Platinum	200,000^{‡}
Italy (FIMI)	Gold	25,000^{‡}
New Zealand (RMNZ)	2× Platinum	60,000^{‡}
Spain (Promusicae)	Platinum	60,000^{‡}
United Kingdom (BPI)	Silver	200,000^{‡}
^{‡} Sales+streaming figures based on certification alone.
