= Rio Grande Mud =

Studio album by ZZ Top
- Released: 4 April 1972
- Recorded: September 1971 – January 1972
- Studios: Robin Hood, Tyler, Texas
- Genres: Blues; blues rock; hard rock
- Length: 38:55
- Label: London
- Producer: Bill Ham

ZZ Top chronology
| ZZ Top's First Album (1971) | Rio Grande Mud (1972) | Tres Hombres (1973) |

Singles from Rio Grande Mud
- 1. "Francine" Released: April 1972

Rio Grande Mud is the second studio album by the American rock band ZZ Top. It was released on 4 April 1972 by the London Records label. The album title was inspired by the Rio Grande, the river that forms the border between Mexico and Texas.

== Background ==
The band started writing songs for Rio Grande Mud while touring to support their first album. Guitarist Billy Gibbons said, "We started documenting events as they happened to us on the road; all of these elements went into the songwriting notebook. As we went along, we were keeping track of skeleton ideas as they popped up. The craft was certainly developing."

== Recording ==
The album was recorded at Robin Hood Studios in Tyler, Texas, owned and operated by engineer Robin "Hood" Brians, who handled all engineering duties on both this album and ZZ Top's debut.

In 1987, the album was remixed for its first CD release, with added percussion in the style of Eliminator and Afterburner. Fans complained that the authentic boogie and blues of the album was compromised by 1980s-style overproduction. On January 11, 2011, Rhino Records issued a remastered version from the original 1972 mix on vinyl only, and the original mix was finally released on CD in June 2013 as part of the box set The Complete Studio Albums (1970–1990).

Dusty Hill played bass throughout the album, providing the low-end foundation for Gibbons' guitar work. Hill's bass playing on Rio Grande Mud was later singled out by AllMusic as one of the album's strongest assets, described as the most complementary element to Gibbons' lead work.

== Release and reception ==
Professional ratings
Review scores
| Source | Rating |
|---|---|
| AllMusic | 3.5/5 stars |
| Christgau's Record Guide | C |
| Rolling Stone | Mixed |
| The Rolling Stone Album Guide | 2/5 stars |
| The Daily Vault | A− |

The only single released from the album was "Francine", which peaked at number 69 on the Billboard Hot 100. The A-side was the album version, while the B-side featured the song with the vocals re-recorded in Spanish. Another 45 version was released in the UK and Germany backed with "Down Brownie". Various official ZZ Top releases throughout the years, beginning in 1972, have used the alternative spelling "Francene", especially on the various 45 releases both within and outside the United States as well as the first edition of the LP.

Rio Grande Mud received mixed reviews upon release, though it has been reassessed more favorably in later years. AllMusic retrospectively awarded the album 3.5 out of 5 stars, describing it as the first flowering of ZZ Top as a great, down-and-dirty blues rock band, noting that while a couple of tracks don't quite gel, the album represented a significant step forward from the debut.

Robert Christgau awarded the album a C in Christgau's Record Guide: Rock Albums of the Seventies (1981), placing it in his lower tier of the decade's rock releases. Rolling Stone gave the album a mixed review at the time of release, though the magazine's broader coverage of ZZ Top would become considerably more enthusiastic with the breakthrough of Tres Hombres the following year.

The Daily Vault awarded the album an A−, describing it as a strong and cohesive statement of the band's blues rock identity.

Commercially, the album peaked at number 104 on the Billboard 200 in June 1972 and number 85 on the Australian Albums chart. The single "Francine" reached number 69 on the Billboard Hot 100, giving the band their first charting single.

In 1987, the album was remixed for CD release. On January 11, 2011, Rhino released a remastered version from the original 1972 mix on vinyl only. This album was put up for download on Amazon's MP3 store and iTunes as a digital download in 2012, and features the original mixes of the tracks that are on Chrome, Smoke & BBQ, and the 1987 remixes of the tracks that are not from that box set. The original mix of the album was released on CD in June 2013 as part of the box set The Complete Studio Albums (1970-1990).

== Track listing ==
Side one
| No. | Title | Writer(s) | Length |
|---|---|---|---|
| 1. | "Francine" | Billy Gibbons, Steve Perron, Kenny Cordray | 3:33 |
| 2. | "Just Got Paid" | Gibbons, Bill Ham | 4:49 |
| 3. | "Mushmouth Shoutin'" | Gibbons, Ham | 3:41 |
| 4. | "Ko Ko Blue" | Gibbons, Dusty Hill, Frank Beard | 4:56 |
| 5. | "Chevrolet" | Gibbons | 3:47 |

Side two
| No. | Title | Writer(s) | Length |
|---|---|---|---|
| 1. | "Apologies to Pearly (instrumental)" | Gibbons, Hill, Beard, Ham | 2:39 |
| 2. | "Bar-B-Q" | Gibbons, Ham | 3:34 |
| 3. | "Sure Got Cold After the Rain Fell" | Gibbons | 7:39 |
| 4. | "Whiskey'n Mama" | Gibbons, Hill, Beard, Ham | 3:20 |
| 5. | "Down Brownie" | Gibbons | 2:53 |
| Total length: | | | 38:55 |

== Personnel ==
=== ZZ Top ===
- Billy Gibbons – guitar, slide guitar, harmonica, vocals
- Dusty Hill – bass, backing vocals
- Frank Beard – drums

=== Additional personnel ===
- Pete Tickle – acoustic guitar on "Mushmouth Shoutin'"

=== Production ===
- Bill Ham – production
- Robin Hood Brians – engineering

== Charts ==
Chart performance for Rio Grande Mud
| Chart (1972–1974) | Peak position |
|---|---|
| Australian Albums (Kent Music Report) | 85 |
| US Billboard 200 | 104 |
