= Frank Beard (drummer) =

American drummer (1949–2026)

- Beard in 1983

Background information
- Born: Frank Lee Beard; June 11, 1949; Frankston, Texas, U.S.
- Died: August 17, 2026 (aged 77) Richmond, Texas, U.S.
- Genres: Blues rock; hard rock; boogie rock; Southern rock
- Occupation: Drummer
- Years active: 1957–2026
- Formerly of: ZZ Top; American Blues

Frank Lee Beard (June 11, 1949 – August 17, 2026) was an American musician who was the drummer of the rock band ZZ Top for over 50 years. The trio enjoyed early success with songs such as "Tush" and "La Grange". In 1983, ZZ Top released the drum machine-assisted Eliminator, which was certified diamond and featured "Gimme All Your Lovin'" and "Sharp Dressed Man".

== Early life and education ==
Frank Lee Beard was born on June 11, 1949, in Frankston, Texas, and raised in Irving. He attended Irving High School. As a teenager, he met Dusty Hill when their bands played the same show at a Fort Worth club, and Hill later asked him to join the Warlocks.

== Career ==
Before joining ZZ Top, Beard was a member of a fake version of the British band the Zombies, which toured in the U.S. without authorization from the original band members. He also played in the Dallas area band Outlaws with Hill, who later joined ZZ Top. Other bands Beard and Hill played with early in their careers included the Cellar Dwellers, the Hustlers, the Warlocks, and American Blues.

When ZZ Top's first drummer, Dan Mitchell, left the band in 1969, he was replaced by Beard. Beard introduced Billy Gibbons, the founder of the Moving Sidewalks, to Hill. After honing their trademark "Texas boogie-blues-rock" style, with the assistance of manager Bill Ham and engineer Robin Hood Brians, the three released ZZ Top's First Album on London Records in January 1971. The music and songs reflected ZZ Top's blues influences. Following their debut album, the band released Rio Grande Mud (1972), which produced their first charting single, "Francine".

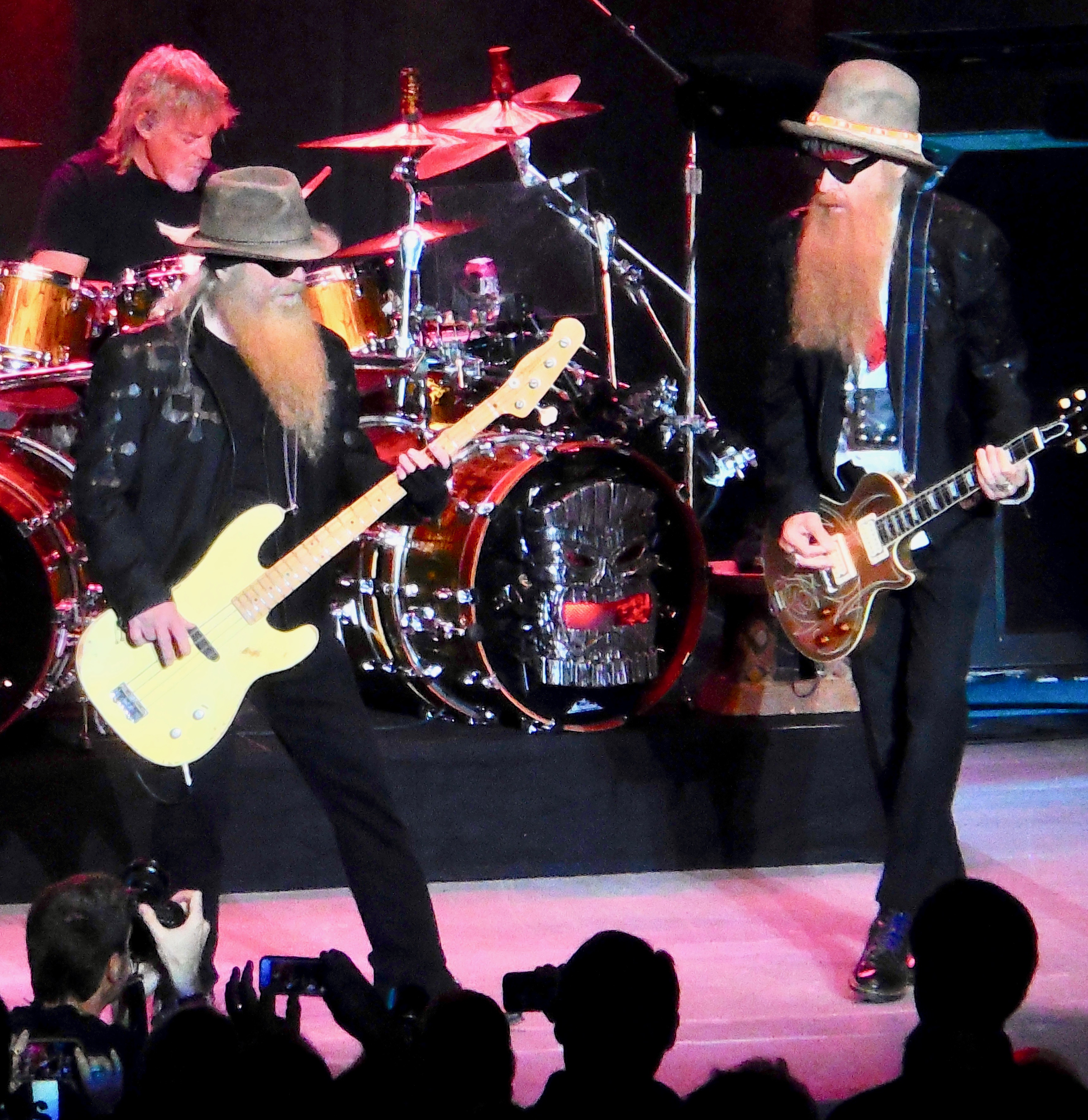
Beard (background) was the only member of ZZ Top who did not sport a long beard.

Beard was initially credited under the nickname Rube Beard on ZZ Top's First Album and on Tres Hombres, but was credited under his actual name on Rio Grande Mud and on every ZZ Top album from 1975's Fandango! While Gibbons and Hill sported their trademark 20-inch (51 cm) beards, Beard was long known as the only member of the band not to have a beard, though he briefly grew a short one in 2013. He became known as "The Man With No Beard".

On 1973's Tres Hombres, the band developed its heavy blues style and amplified its roots in Texas music. In 2026, Billboard said, "ZZ Top became national rock stars in the mid-'70s with the release of Tres Hombres, with Beard's explosive-but-swinging drumming playing a huge part in the band's sonic identity." The boogie rock single "La Grange" brought the band their first hit, with it just missing the Billboard Top 40. In 1975, they released "Tush", the band's first Top 20 hit and one of its most popular songs. The 1976 album, Tejas, was certified gold, with sales in excess of 500,000.

In 1976, after almost seven years of touring and a string of successful albums, ZZ Top went on hiatus for three years while Beard dealt with his addiction problems. They returned with Degüello, which went platinum and featured their second top-40 hit, a cover of Isaac Hayes' "I Thank You". The album also included the concert staple “Cheap Sunglasses".

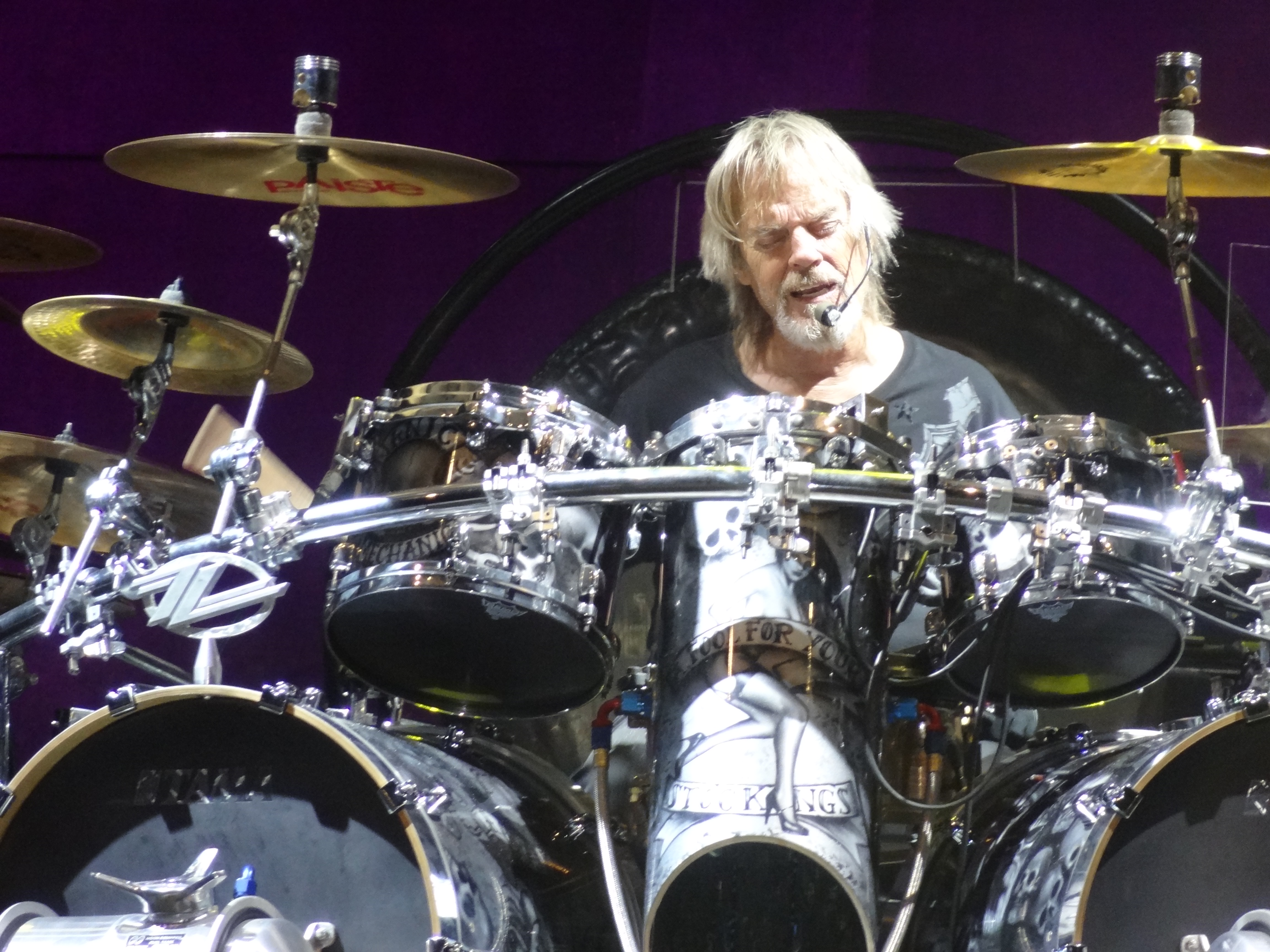
Beard performing with ZZ Top in 2014

The album Eliminator, released in March 1983, featured two top-40 singles ("Gimme All Your Lovin'" and "Legs"), and two additional Top Rock hits ("Got Me Under Pressure" and "Sharp Dressed Man"). The album became a critical and commercial success, reaching No. 9 in the U.S. Billboard pop charts, the only ZZ Top album to be certified diamond by the RIAA for selling over 10 million copies. Engineer Terry Manning later revealed that Beard's substance abuse so badly affected his performance the drummer was eventually dismissed from the sessions. Manning handled nearly all the percussion for Eliminator, mainly by programming various drum machines, with occasional use of samples from real drums recorded live in the studio.

Despite selling fewer copies than Eliminator, Afterburner (1985) became ZZ Top's highest-charting album, reaching No. 4 on the U.S. Billboard chart, with sales of five million copies. Four of the five singles from Afterburner were top-40 hits, with "Sleeping Bag" and "Stages" also topping the Mainstream Rock chart. "Velcro Fly" peaked at No. 35 on the Billboard Hot 100 in August 1986, the band's last top-40 hit.

Beard appears with ZZ Top in a cameo in the movie Back to the Future Part III, in which they perform an acoustic version of their Recycler song "Doubleback" alongside a fiddle band. In 2004, ZZ Top was inducted into the Rock and Roll Hall of Fame. The band was featured in the 2019 documentary ZZ Top: That Little Ol' Band from Texas.

== Personal life and death ==
Beard married his girlfriend when she became pregnant and they started to raise a daughter, living for some time with Beard's parents. He married for a second time, to Debbie Meredith, and the couple had twin boys in 1985, while also raising Beard's daughter from his previous marriage.

After achieving success with ZZ Top in the late 1970s, Beard spent large sums of money on drugs, including LSD, cocaine, and heroin. He later regretted the spending and said it damaged his relationships. He joined a rehabilitation program. He recalled: "I just wanted to get sober. I wanted to be like people I admired who could sit home and watch TV and go to bed and that was okay [for them]."

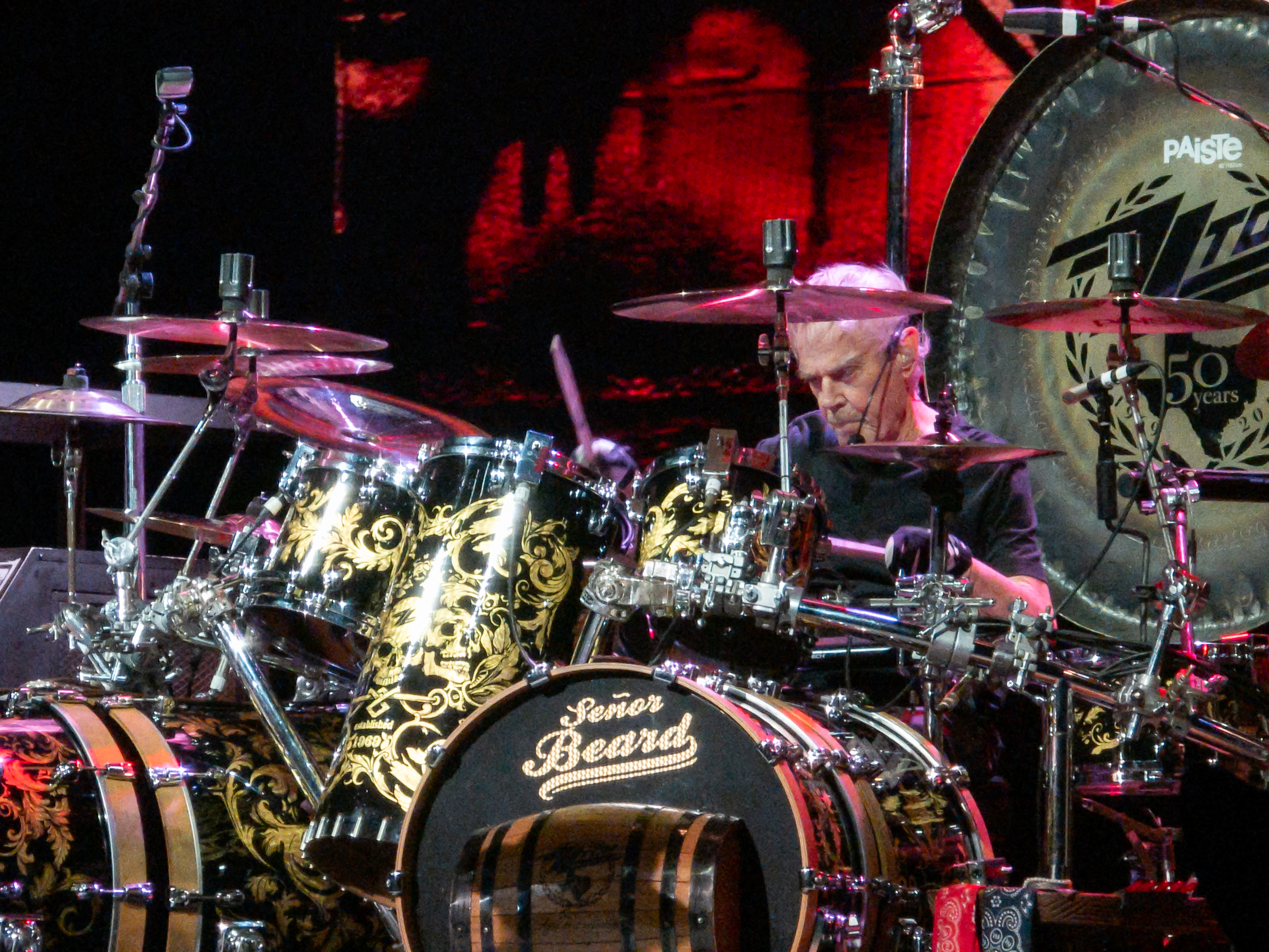
Beard performing at Caesars Windsor in 2025

In the early 1990s, Beard entered sports car racing, competing in the 24 Hours of Daytona and 12 Hours of Sebring. Jeremy Clarkson claimed that Beard once said he had a Ferrari because that way "I can leave for the party later, get there first, stay longer and still be in bed with someone before anyone else."

Beard missed some shows for an emergency appendectomy in 2002. In March 2025, he temporarily left the Elevation tour due to illness and then returned.His final public performance with ZZ Top was on November 2, 2025, at Viejas Casino & Resort in Alpine, California.

ZZ Top cancelled its August 5, 2026 show at Hollywood Bowl in Los Angeles, reportedly due to Beard's health. He died under hospice care at his ranch in Richmond, Texas on August 17, at the age of 77. Gibbons called Beard "one of the most naturally innovative drummers and a great and true son of Texas. His signature backbeat was key to keeping ZZ on top".

The day after Beard's death, Gibbons announced Beard's wish that the band continue their tour. Beard was the second member of the classic ZZ Top lineup to die, following bassist Dusty Hill in 2021. Gibbons, the sole surviving original member, continued touring with bassist Elwood Francis and drummer Michael Monahan.

== See also ==
- ZZ Top discography
