= Tush (ZZ Top song) =

Single by ZZ Top

from the album Fandango!
- B-side: "Blue Jean Blues"
- Released: July 1975
- Recorded: December 30, 1974 – March 23, 1975
- Genre: Hard rock; blues rock; boogie rock; Southern rock
- Length: 2:15
- Label: London
- Songwriters: Billy Gibbons; Dusty Hill; Frank Beard
- Producer: Bill Ham

ZZ Top singles chronology
"Beer Drinkers & Hell Raisers" (1974)	"Tush" (1975)	"It's Only Love" (1976)

Audio sample
- file; help

"Tush" is a song by American blues rock band ZZ Top and was the only single from their fourth album Fandango! The song was named the 67th best hard rock song of all time by VH1.

== Composition ==
The song is a twelve-bar blues in the key of G in standard tuning. Bassist Dusty Hill has said the song was written at a sound check in about ten minutes. The recording was produced by Bill Ham and recorded and mixed by Terry Manning.

Billy Gibbons said, "We were in Florence, Alabama, playing in a rodeo arena with a dirt floor. We decided to play a bit in the afternoon. I hit that opening lick, and Dave Blayney, our lighting director, gave us the hand [twirls a finger in the air]: 'Keep it going.' Then Dusty leaned over, and said, “What are we going to call this thing?". The Texas singer Roy Head had a flip side in 1966, 'Tush Hog.' Down South, the word meant deluxe, plush. And a tush hog was very deluxe. We had the riff going, Dusty fell in with the vocal, and we wrote it in three minutes. We had the advantage of that dual meaning of the word 'tush' [grins]. It's that secret blues language — saying it without saying it."

== Critical reception ==
Cash Box said that it has "some slide lead guitar work that'll have 'em bumpin' their 'tushes' from Dallas to L.A." and called the song "super summer dance rock and roll." Record World said the song "comes in a tight little hard rock package, just waiting to be let loose to boogie, boogie, boogie!"

== Hill's death ==
As the closing song in their setlists for many tours "Tush" would be the last song Hill would sing. After the death of Hill in 2021, the band performed the song for the first time on July 30, 2021, in Tuscaloosa, Alabama, with Gibbons placing Dusty's hat on his microphone then Gibbons taking lead vocals to the song. A few tour dates later on August 6, Gibbons told the crowd “We’re going to have Dusty singing through the magic of Memorex.” For the remainder of 2021, the band would end their concerts by playing the song along to an audio vocal recording from Hill's last performance. At the conclusion of the band's 2021 tour, the song was removed from the setlist.

== Charts ==
=== Weekly charts ===
Chart (1975)	Peak position
Australia (Kent Music Report)	87
Canada RPM Top Singles	14
U.S. Billboard Hot 100	20
U.S. Cash Box Top 100	12

=== Year-end charts ===
Chart (1975)	Position
Canada Top Singles (RPM)	126

== Personnel ==
- Billy Gibbons – guitar
- Dusty Hill – bass guitar, vocals
- Frank Beard – drums
