= Dusty Hill =

American bassist with rock band ZZ Top (1949–2021)

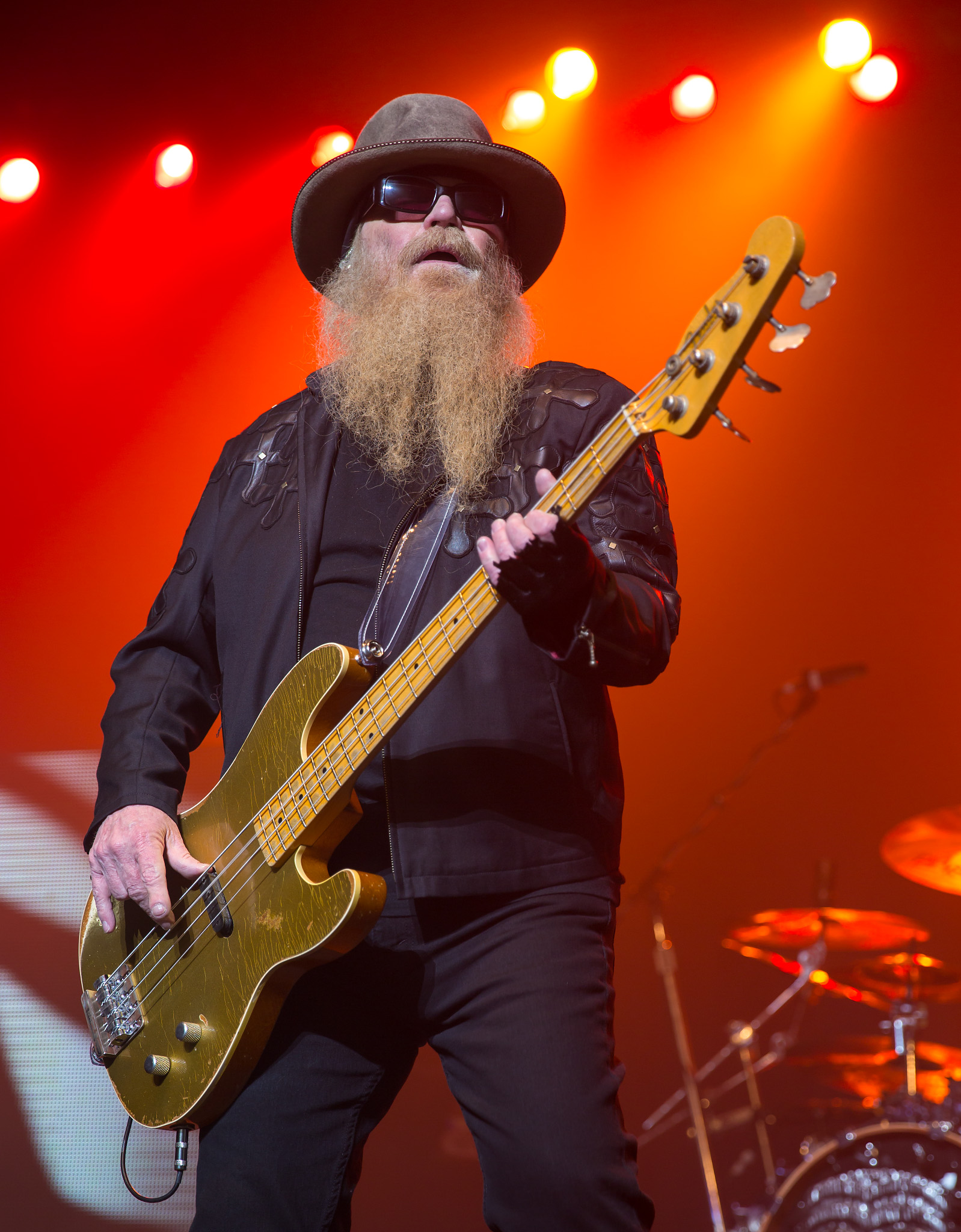
- Hill performing in 2015

Background information
- Born: Joseph Michael Hill; May 19, 1949; Dallas, Texas, U.S.
- Died: July 28, 2021 (aged 72) Houston, Texas, U.S.
- Genres: Blues rock; hard rock; boogie rock; southern rock
- Occupations: Musician; songwriter
- Instruments: Bass guitar; vocals
- Years active: 1957–2021
- Formerly of: ZZ Top; American Blues

Joseph Michael "Dusty" Hill (May 19, 1949 – July 28, 2021) was an American musician who was the bassist of the rock band ZZ Top for more than 50 years. He also sang backing and lead vocals and played keyboards.

Hill was born in Dallas, Texas. As a child, he began performing music with his brother, Rocky Hill. In 1968, he and the drummer Frank Beard joined the guitarist Billy Gibbons in ZZ Top; they went on to release albums including the bestselling Eliminator (1983). Hill favored simple compositions and a "big", distorted sound. Critics described his basslines as a critical part of ZZ Top's sound, complementing Gibbons' guitar showmanship.

Hill was inducted into the Rock and Roll Hall of Fame as a member of ZZ Top in 2004. Hill died in 2021 after a period of declining health. In line with his wishes, he was succeeded by the band's longtime guitar tech, Elwood Francis.

== Early life ==
Hill was born in Dallas, Texas, on May 19, 1949. He and his older brother Rocky, also a musician, were raised in the Lakewood neighborhood of East Dallas. He attended Woodrow Wilson High School, where he played the cello. Like his future bandmates, Hill grew up listening to blues music, which he said was uncommon in white families; he recalled shocking the parents of his childhood friends when he brought records by Muddy Waters or Son House to their houses.

Hill began singing for money with his older brother Rocky at the age of 8. Dusty took up bass at the age of 13 when Rocky, a guitarist, formed a band with a drummer and insisted that Dusty learn to play bass so he could join them. He received his first bass soon after and immediately began playing shows. Unlike many bassists, he did not learn to play guitar first. He said, "I kind of learned how to play on stage and whatnot, and embarrassment is a great motivator. If you don't play well, standing up there with lights on, it really stands out, so it behooves you to get your shit up pretty quick." He did not enjoy school, and achieved poor grades; according to Hill, "Part of the problem was that by the time I was 13 I was already playing in local bars, so school kinda got in the way of that and I resented it."

== ZZ Top ==
Hill, Rocky, and the future ZZ Top drummer Frank Beard played in local Dallas bands the Warlocks, the Cellar Dwellers, and American Blues. From 1966 to 1968, American Blues played the Dallas-Fort Worth-Houston circuit. In 1969, Hill was a member of a fake version of the British band the Zombies with Beard. Hill recalled, "Being a musician in Texas had its own set of risks ... and at that time we had long, blue hair – in the 60s in Texas. I got probably less shit about having blue hair than about having long hair, because I believe they thought I was crazy."

In 1968, American Blues relocated to Houston. At this time, Rocky wanted to focus on "straight blues", while Dusty wanted the band to rock more. Rocky left and Dusty and Beard moved to Houston. They joined guitarist-vocalist Billy Gibbons of the Houston psychedelic band the Moving Sidewalks in the recently formed ZZ Top, just after they released their first single "Salt Lick", in 1969.

With Gibbons as the main lyricist and arranger, Hill played bass and keyboards and sang lead on some songs. With the assistance of manager Bill Ham and engineer Robin Hood Brians, ZZ Top's First Album (1971) was released and exhibited the band's humor, with "barrelhouse" rhythms, distorted guitars, double entendres, and innuendo. The music and songs reflected ZZ Top's blues influences. Following their debut album, the band released Rio Grande Mud (1972), which produced their first charting single, "Francine".

On 1973's Tres Hombres, ZZ Top developed its heavy blues style and amplified its roots in Texas music. The boogie rock single "La Grange" brought the band their first hit, with it just missing the Billboard Top 40. In 1975, Hill sang lead vocals on "Tush", the band's first Top 20 hit and one of its most popular songs, and duetted with Gibbons on "Heard it on the X" on the album Fandango! On the 1976 album Tejas, Hill took the vocal lead on "Pan Am Highway Blues", "Avalon Hideaway" and "Ten Dollar Man", and duetted with Gibbons on "It’s Only Love".

In 1976, after almost seven years of touring and a string of successful albums, ZZ Top went on hiatus for three years while Beard dealt with his addiction problems. Hill spent the period working at Dallas Fort Worth International Airport, saying he wanted to "feel normal" and "ground himself" after years spent performing. He was rarely recognized, but told fans who asked: "No! Do you think I’d be sitting here?"

In 1979, when ZZ Top returned with the album Degüello, Gibbons and Hill revealed their new image of matching massive beards and sunglasses. Their hit singles from this period, "Cheap Sunglasses" and "Pearl Necklace", showed a more modern sound. In 1983, ZZ Top released Eliminator, a bestselling record which made the band "bona fide pop stars", according to the Financial Times.

Hill's on-screen appearances include Back to the Future Part III, Mother Goose Rock 'n' Rhyme, the July 20, 2009 episode of WWE Raw, and Deadwood, and as himself in the eleventh-season episode of King of the Hill, "Hank Gets Dusted", in which Hank Hill is said to be Dusty's cousin. He also made an appearance on The Drew Carey Show as himself, auditioning for a spot in Drew's band, but was rejected because of his attachment to his beard, which he referred to as a "Texas Goatee".

In 2000, Hill was diagnosed with hepatitis C and ZZ Top canceled their European tour. Hill resumed work in 2002. Hill was inducted into the Rock and Roll Hall of Fame as a member of ZZ Top in 2004. In 2014, Hill fell on his tour bus and injured his hip, requiring surgery. Part of the tour was canceled. On July 23, 2021, Hill left a tour due to problems with his hip. The band performed without him at the Village Commons in New Lenox, Illinois, with the band's guitar tech Elwood Francis on bass per Hill's request. Gibbons later confirmed that Hill had recorded bass and vocals for ZZ Top's upcoming sixteenth album before his death.

== Personal life ==
Hill said he believed in God, but that he did not know "what or who God actually is". He declined to say if he was a Republican or Democrat, and said: "I just tell them that I'm a Texan. Left to my own devices, I'd never leave Texas. Everything is bigger in Texas."

On December 16, 1984, Hill accidentally shot himself in the abdomen when his derringer fell from his boot and discharged. He drove himself to a hospital before going into shock. He made a full recovery.

Hill married his longtime girlfriend, actress Charleen McCrory, in 2002. He had one daughter.

== Death ==
On July 28, 2021, Hill died of a blood clot at his home in Houston, Texas, at the age of 72. Hill's wife later said that he was looking to get more physical therapy for his chronic bursitis. Gibbons confirmed that ZZ Top would continue with Elwood Francis, the band's longtime guitar tech, on bass, per Hill's wishes. According to Gibbons, "Dusty emphatically grabbed my arm and said, 'Give Elwood the bottom end, and take it to the Top.' He meant it, amigo. He really did."

Rock musicians and contemporaries paid condolences through social media, including Paul Stanley, Ozzy Osbourne, John Fogerty, Flea, Zakk Wylde, Warren Haynes, Tony Iommi, David Coverdale, Scorpions, Foghat, Brian May, Kentucky Headhunters, Blackberry Smoke, Steve Miller Band, 38 Special, and the Allman Brothers Band. On August 6, Hill was featured in the BBC Radio 4 obituary program Last Word. Duck Dynasty star Phil Robertson said he had been asked by Hill's widow to give the eulogy at the funeral service. Hill was buried in a private service on August 7, 2021, at Forest Park the Woodlands Cemetery in the Woodlands, Texas.

== Musicianship ==
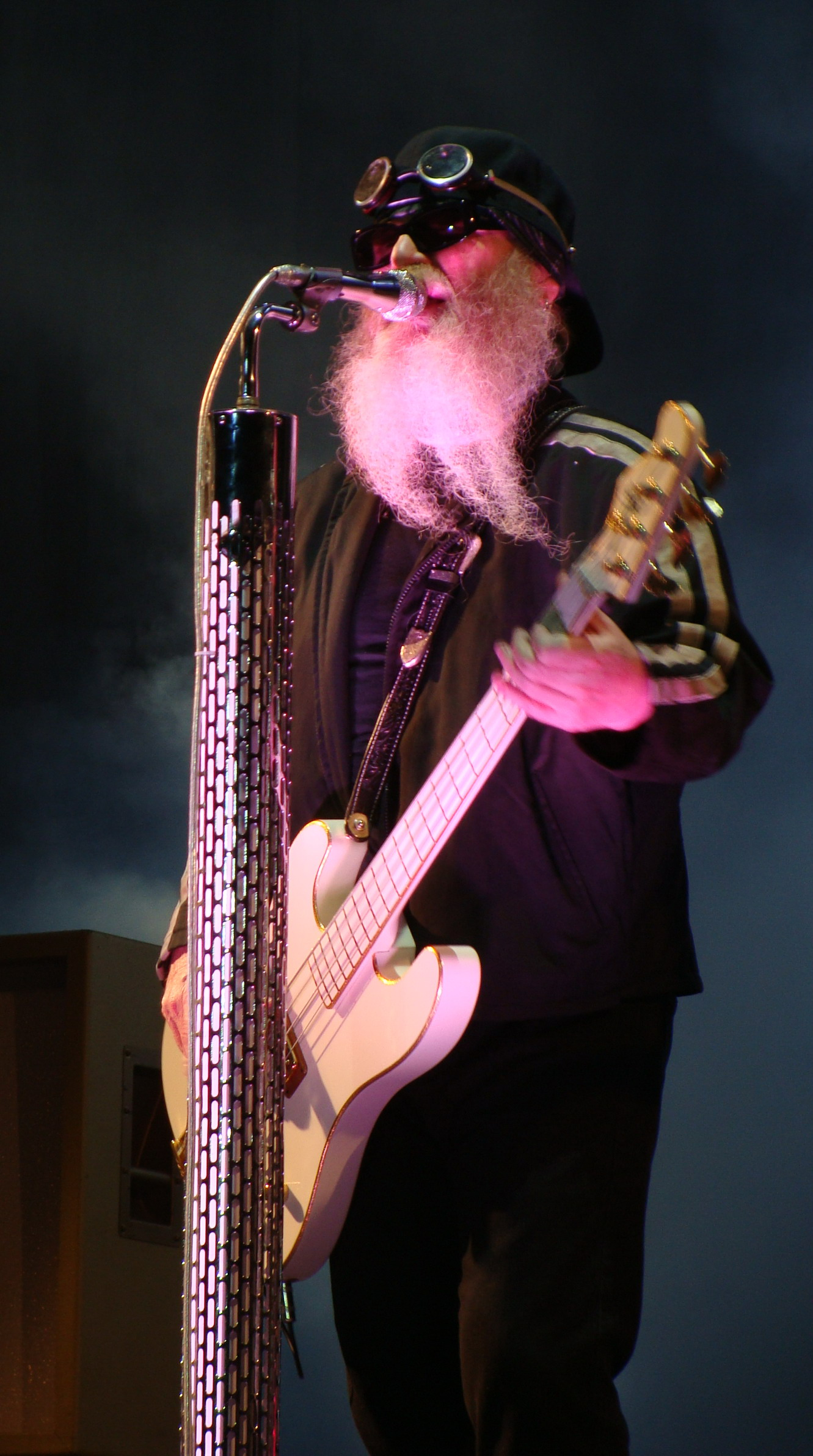
Hill performing in 2008

Hill cited the Cream bassist Jack Bruce and the jazz bassists Stanley Clarke and Charles Mingus as early influences. He said he once played more complicated bass parts, but came to prioritize composition over complexity: "Sometimes you don't even notice the bass – I hate that in a way, but I love that in a way. That's a compliment. That means you've filled in everything and it's right for the song, and you're not standing out where you don't need to be." The New York Times described him as a "precise musical mechanic" complementing Gibbons' "showy virtuoso".

Michael Hann of The Guardian wrote that Hill's bass tone was as crucial to ZZ Top's sound as Gibbons' guitar. Hill described his tone as "big, heavy, and a bit distorted because it has to overlap the guitar. Someone once asked me to describe my tone, and I said it was like farting in a trash can. What I meant is it's raw, but you've got to have the tone in there." Hill sang lead on several ZZ Top songs. The Guardian described his vocals as a "high, true" tenor contrasting against Gibbons' "radioactive growl".

== Discography ==
=== American Blues ===
- American Blues
- American Blues 'Is Here' (1968)
- Do Their Thing (1969)
