= Bill Ham =

American Music impresario, manager of ZZ Top (1937–2016)

Background information
- Born: Billy Mack Ham; February 4, 1937; Waxahachie, Texas, U.S.
- Died: June 20, 2016 (aged 79) Austin, Texas, U.S.
- Genres: Rock; blues rock; country
- Occupations: Record producer; band manager
- Years active: 1960–2016
- Spouse: Cecile Ham (died 1991)

Billy Mack Ham (February 4, 1937 – June 20, 2016) was an American music impresario, best known as the manager, producer, and image-maker for the blues-rock band ZZ Top. Ham also gained prominence in the country music world by discovering and managing singer-songwriter Clint Black.

== Career ==
Ham began his career as a singer, releasing the single "Wanderer" on Dot Records in 1960. Cash Box called it a "bright rocker" with a "sensational backbeat."

By 1968, Ham was working as a record promoter for Bud Daily Distributing when he saw the Moving Sidewalks, the band that would become ZZ Top, perform on the bill at a Doors concert in Houston, and went backstage to compliment them. When the Moving Sidewalks fired their manager, they recruited Ham to replace him. Ham was instrumental to ZZ Top's success, co-writing songs, constructing their image, and producing every one of the group's albums from ZZ Top's First Album (1971) through Rhythmeen (1996). Ham and ZZ Top parted ways in 2006.

Ham also saw success in management and publishing outside of ZZ Top. His Lone Wolf Management produced such artists as Jay Boy Adams, Clint Black and Point Blank, and songwriters signed to his Hamstein Music publishing company scored 100 Top 10 country singles, including 60 number ones.

== Personal life and death ==
In Houston on July 2, 1991, Ham's wife, 48-year-old Cecile, was kidnapped from a drugstore parking lot and murdered by 22-year-old Spencer Corey Goodman, a recently paroled repeat offender. Goodman was apprehended five weeks later following a high-speed chase where he crashed Cecile's stolen car. He was convicted of murder, sentenced to death, and executed by lethal injection on January 18, 2000. Ham witnessed the execution.

Ham died on June 20, 2016, at his home in Austin, Texas, aged 79.
