= Only Love =

Only Love may refer to:

== Books ==
- Only Love, a 1997 novel by Erich Segal
- Only Love, a 1995 novel by Ann Maxwell writing as Elizabeth Lowell

== Film and TV ==
- Only Love, a 1998 television film starring Marisa Tomei
- Only Love (TV series) (Korean: 사랑만 할래) 2014 TV series

== Music ==
- Only Love (album), by The Armed, 2018

=== Songs ===
- "Only Love" (Anggun song), 2011
- "Only Love" (Ben Howard song), 2012
- "Only Love" (The Braxtons song), 1997
- "Only Love" (Engelbert Humperdinck/Selena song), 1997
- "Only Love" (Nana Mouskouri song), 1986
- "Only Love" (Shaggy song), 2015
- "Only Love" (Wynonna Judd song), 1993
- "Only Love", by Alkaline Trio from My Shame Is True, 2013
- "Only Love", by Brotherhood of Man from Singing a Song, 1979
- "Only Love", by Groove Coverage from Covergirl, 2002
- "Only Love", by Katy Perry from Smile, 2020
- "Only Love", by KC and the Sunshine Band from Space Cadet Solo Flight, 1981
- "Only Love", by Mary J. Blige, 2018
- "Only Love", by Mumford & Sons from Wilder Mind, 2015
- "Only Love", by Way Out West from We Love Machine, 2009
- "Only Love", by the Wildhearts from The Wildhearts Must Be Destroyed, 2003

== See also ==
- Only Love, L, an album by Lena Meyer-Landrut, 2019
- My Only Love (disambiguation)
- It's Only Love (disambiguation)
