= It's Only Love (disambiguation) =

"It's Only Love" is a 1965 song by The Beatles, covered by Gary U.S. Bonds and others

It's Only Love may also refer to:

== Film and television ==
- It's Only Love (film), a 1947 Austrian film directed by Emmerich Hanus
- "It's Only Love", an episode of Working Girl

== Music ==
=== Albums ===
- It's Only Love (Rita Coolidge album) or the title song, 1975
- It's Only Love (Simply Red album) or the title song, a cover of the Barry White song (see below), 2000
- It's Only Love, or the title song (see below), by Tommy James and the Shondells, 1966

=== Songs ===
- "It's Only Love" (B. J. Thomas song), 1969
- "It's Only Love" (Bryan Adams song), 1985
- "It's Only Love" (Cheap Trick song), 1986
- "It's Only Love" (Donna Summer song), 2008
- "It's Only Love" (Jeannie Seely song), 1966
- "It's Only Love" (Matt Cardle song), 2012
- "It's Only Love" (Tommy James and the Shondells song), 1966
- "It's Only Love" (ZZ Top song), 1976
- "It's Only Love"/"Sorry Baby", by Masaharu Fukuyama, 1994
- "It's Only Love Doing Its Thing", by Barry White, 1978; covered by Simply Red as "It's Only Love"
- "It's Only Love", by Def Leppard from Euphoria, 1999
- "It's Only Love", by Ejecta from Dominae, 2013
- "It's Only Love", by James Marriott from Don't Tell the Dog, 2025
- "It's Only Love", by Joe Cocker from Respect Yourself, 2002
- "It's Only Love", by Samantha Fox from Touch Me, 1986
- "It's Only Love", by Sheryl Crow from C'mon, C'mon, 2002
- "It's Only Love", by Stevie Nicks from Trouble in Shangri-La, 2001

== See also ==
- Only Love (disambiguation)
