= List of Jake and the Fatman episodes =

The following is a list of episodes for Jake and the Fatman, an American crime drama television series created by Dean Hargrove and Joel Steiger for CBS. During the course of the series, 106 episodes of Jake and the Fatman aired over five seasons, between September 26, 1987, and May 6, 1992.

== Series overview ==
Season	Episodes	Originally released		
Season	Episodes	First released	Last released	Network
Pilot	2	October 28, 1986	November 4, 1986	NBC
1	23	September 26, 1987	April 6, 1988	CBS
2	11	March 15, 1989	May 24, 1989	CBS
3	26	September 20, 1989	May 16, 1990	CBS
4	24	September 12, 1990	May 8, 1991	CBS
5	22	September 18, 1991	May 6, 1992	CBS

== Episodes ==
=== Pilot (Matlock season one episodes) (1986) ===
No. overall	No. in season	Title	Directed by	Written by	Original release date	Rating/share (households)
5	5	"The Don: Part 1"	Nicholas Sgarro	Anne Collins	October 28, 1986	17.6/27
Ben and Charlene take the controversial case of a Mafia don Nicholas Baron (José Ferrer) accused of murdering a business rival Donald Kovack (Charles Howerton); Charlene is attracted to the man's son, Paul Baron (Joe Penny). Other guest stars: Betty Lynn as Sarah (Ben's secretary), Johnny Silver as Eddie Alonzo, Joe Penny as Paul Baron, José Ferrer as Nicholas Baron, Doran Clark as Cathy Baron, Mark La Mura as Dr. Daniel Baron, William Conrad as D.A. James L. McShane (precursor to Jake and the Fatman), Alan Campbell as Palmer (James L. McShane's assistant), James McEachin as Lt. Frank Daniels, Joseph Hacker as Phillip Kovack, Claude Earl Jones as Mr. Henderson, Ron Karabatsos as Dave Christopher, Sheree North as Alice Jenkins, Dominic Oliver as Roy Vincient, Joan Roberts as Mrs. Kovack, Tom McCleister as a Metro Cop, Lucille Meredith as Judge Irene Sawyer
6	6	"The Don: Part 2"	Leo Penn	Anne Collins; Story by : Dean Hargrove & Joel Steiger	November 4, 1986	17.3/25
Matlock continues to defend a mafia don (who investigates a suspect closer to home than the baron would want), while Charlene blows her chance at a relationship with Paul when she is unable to separate the man from the legend. Guest Stars: Joe Penny, José Ferrer, Doran Clark, Mark La Mura, William Conrad, Alan Campbell, James McEachin, Ron Karabatsos, Joan Roberts, Sheree North, and Arthur Adams as Mr. Johnson

=== Season 1 (1987–88) ===
No. overall	No. in season	Title	Directed by	Written by	Original release date	Rating/share (households)
1	1	"Happy Days Are Here Again"	E.W. Swackhamer	S : Mitch Paradise, Dean Hargrove, Joel Steiger; T : Tom Lazarus	September 26, 1987	12.5/24
A speechwriter frames a politician for murdering his assistant, then tries to blackmail him.
2	2	"Fatal Attraction"	Ron Satlof	Douglas Stefen Borghi	September 29, 1987	9.6/15
3	3	"Fatal Attraction"	Ron Satlof	Douglas Stefen Borghi	September 29, 1987	9.6/15
McCabe sets out to prove that a wealthy businessman was murdered by his widow and son – two lovers conspiring to get his money.
4	4	"Laura"	E.W. Swackhamer	S : Dean Hargrove, Joel Steiger; T : Tom Lazarus	October 6, 1987	14.8/23
Jake's former partner is killed while chasing an alleged burglar, but the evidence points towards the dead man's fiancee.
5	5	"The Man That Got Away"	E.W. Swackhamer	Michael Genelin	October 13, 1987	14.4/22
Jake and McCabe question the evidence found in the case of a woman charged with murder whose lawyer (Robert Culp) is also her ex-husband.
6	6	"Love for Sale"	Christopher Hibler	Douglas Stefen Borghi	October 20, 1987	13.0/20
Jake becomes attracted to a woman involved in a drug-smuggling operation while investigating the murder of one of McCabe's informants.
7	7	"Brother, Can You Spare a Dime?"	Tony Mordente	S : Dean Hargrove, Joel Steiger; T : Robert Hamilton	October 27, 1987	12.2/19
A skid-row serial killer (Dwight Schultz) matches wits with McCabe after murdering a surprising victim.
8	8	"Body and Soul"	Jerry Jameson	S : Dean Hargrove, Joel Steiger; T : Tom Lazarus	November 3, 1987	11.3/18
Jake helps a determined cop – who's also a former lover – try to convict the man who killed her father, a criminal whom McCabe suspects of committing another murder.
9	9	"The Man I Love"	Michael Lange	Robert Hamilton	November 10, 1987	13.6/21
A young bride survives an attempt on her life, so McCabe sends Jake to dig up dirt on her suspicious husband.
10	10	"Love Me or Leave Me"	Michael Preece	Paul Robert Coyle	November 17, 1987	12.0/18
Jake gets close to an aspiring rock star in order to catch a dirty cop who's involved in a million-dollar robbery.
11	11	"Smoke Gets in Your Eyes"	Harvey Laidman	Paul Robert Coyle	December 1, 1987	14.1/22
The man who attacked a blind woman is found dead – supposedly shot by the woman's cheating husband.
12	12	"Have Yourself a Merry Little Christmas"	E.W. Swackhamer	Robert Hamilton	December 8, 1987	10.3/16
It's Christmastime, but McCabe isn't feeling so jolly as an ambitious assistant DA helps Jake find a murderous Santa Claus.
13	13	"After You've Gone"	Paul Krasny	S : Philip Saltzman; S/T : Paul Robert Coyle	January 5, 1988	12.9/19
Jake discovers a murder plot and takes the place of a dead hit man whose target happens to be McCabe.
14	14	"It Had to Be You"	Ron Satlof	Paul Robert Coyle	January 12, 1988	11.7/18
When Jake discovers that a serial rapist's weakness is cats, a victim agrees to help set a trap.
15	15	"But Not for Me"	Michael Lange	Robert Hamilton	January 19, 1988	12.8/19
Jake suspects that a newswoman knows more about a gangster's murder than she's letting on, so McCabe attempts to get the truth from an unwilling witness – the newswoman's daughter.
16	16	"What Is This Thing Called Love?"	Harvey Laidman	S : Philip Saltzman; S/T : Tom Lazarus	January 26, 1988	12.9/19
McCabe and Derek are held captive by a grenade-laden gunman claiming to be out for revenge, but Jake discovers a different motive.
17	17	"Lady, Be Good"	E.W. Swackhamer	Tom Lazarus	February 2, 1988	11.8/18
McCabe is accidentally involved as an eyewitness to an incident leading up to the death of a wealthy publisher. He believes that what looks like a drunken-driving accident is a murder. The discovery of a $9-million dollar insurance policy made out to the victim's socialite wife leads McCabe to suspect foul play. He assigns Jake to pose as an insurance investigator who must check out not only the widow but also the insurance company's own investigator, who seems to have an abnormal interest in providing a quick payoff of the insurance money.
18	18	"I'll Be Seeing You"	Harvey Laidman	S : Peter Allen Fields, Dean Hargrove, Joel Steiger; T : Robert Hamilton	February 16, 1988	9.6/14
After ten years on the run, a murder witness returns to use McCabe against a powerful defendant for a big payoff, and Jake must escort the witness to court in one piece.
19	19	"Babyface"	E.W. Swackhamer	Dick Nelson	February 23, 1988	12.4/18
Jake sets out to expose the double life of an alleged kidnapped heiress who's determined to get romantically close to him.
20	20	"Blues in the Night"	Harvey Laidman	Robert Hamilton	March 16, 1988	13.5/21
A pair of twin jewel thieves proves to be a challenge for McCabe as he unknowingly provides an alibi for one sister while the other commits a murder.
21	21	"How Long Has This Thing Been Going On?"	Christian I. Nyby II	S : Franklin Thompson; S/T : Tom Lazarus	March 23, 1988	12.1/20
Jake tries to prove that his friend, a philandering priest, is innocent in the murder of his married lover.
22	22	"I Guess I'll Have to Change My Plans"	Michael Lange	Paul Robert Coyle	March 30, 1988	12.7/20
An author who's a former cop literally kills for a best-seller, giving Jake and McCabe a plot that keeps them guessing.
23	23	"Rhapsody in Blue"	Michael Lange	Robert Hamilton	April 6, 1988	14.8/24
An ambitious exec and his devious wife desperate for success commit a murder and it's up to Jake and McCabe to put them out of business.

=== Season 2 (1989) ===
No. overall	No. in season	Title	Directed by	Written by	Original release date	U.S. viewers (millions)
24	1	"Wish You Were Here"	E.W. Swackhamer	Ed Waters	March 15, 1989	22.1
25	2	"Wish You Were Here"	E.W. Swackhamer	Ed Waters	March 15, 1989	22.1
Jake goes to Oahu to visit his former partner, only to find him murdered, so McCabe arrives from the mainland to help out.
26	3	"I'll Never Smile Again"	Don Medford	T : Rick Kelbaugh, Kevin Droney; S/T : Gael Phillips	March 22, 1989	22.8
McCabe investigates the death of a mugger who assaulted a tourist and uncovers dark secrets that the mainlander and his family have been keeping.
27	4	"Bewitched, Bothered and Bewildered"	Dale White	Jack Fogarty	April 5, 1989	21.6
After witnessing a robbery, Jake falls for the owner of the establishment, while McCabe suspects the robbery is an inside job.
28	5	"Why Can't You Behave?"	Dale White	Kevin Droney	April 12, 1989	20.5
McCabe has a difficult reunion with his son while investigating a plane crash that killed a senator.
29	6	"Poor Butterfly"	Bernard L. Kowalski	Rick Kelbaugh	April 19, 1989	21.1
When a dangerous pimp assaults McCabe's sole witness against him, Jake talks a scared prostitute into helping him set the pimp up.
30	7	"It Ain't Necessarily So"	Bernard L. Kowalski	S : E. Arthur Kean; T : Ed Waters, Rick Kelbaugh, Kevin Droney, Kimmer Ringwald	April 26, 1989	21.3
With the help of a key witness whose testimony intrigues him, McCabe pursues a publisher he suspects of putting a hit on his wife.
31	8	"Someone to Watch Over Me"	Bernard L. Kowalski	Kimmer Ringwald	May 3, 1989	20.2
Jake discovers an old man's connection to a young woman as he races the geezer to find her killer.
32	9	"They Can't Take That Away from Me"	Don Medford	Catherine Bacos Clinch	May 10, 1989	17.4
Jake and McCabe suspect that a hit has been placed on two of Jake's co-workers who are found dead, but discover that one man's marriage suggests trouble in paradise.
33	10	"Side by Side"	Jackie Cooper	Kimmer Ringwald	May 17, 1989	19.7
McCabe and a teenage Crusoe are shipwrecked after a boat explosion.
34	11	"Snowfall"	Jackie Cooper	Rick Kelbaugh	May 24, 1989	14.3
Jake teams up with a Secret Service agent to take down a counterfeit cash-for-cocaine ring.

=== Season 3 (1989–90) ===
No. overall	No. in season	Title	Directed by	Written by	Original release date	U.S. viewers (millions)
35	1	"I Only Have Eyes for You"	Chuck Bowman	Paul Robert Coyle	September 20, 1989	20.4
Jake takes matters into his own hands when a woman is threatened and followed to Hawaii by the psychotic ex-convict who attacked her.
36	2	"The Lady in Red"	Bernard L. Kowalski	Kimmer Ringwald	September 27, 1989	21.9
McCabe's boozing ex-partner turns up dead just as he's about to solve a 20-year-old murder case.
37	3	"Easy to Love"	Alexander Singer	Fred McKnight	October 4, 1989	20.6
Jake seems unable to break the facade of a tough Los Angeles cop whose partner vanished after coming to Hawaii to pick up a convict.
38	4	"The Way You Look Tonight"	Leo Penn	Jeri Taylor	October 11, 1989	21.2
Deciding to take a break from his partner, Jake sets out to investigate a murder case that McCabe lost in court.
39	5	"Dancing in the Dark"	Chuck Bowman	Steven Aspis	October 25, 1989	22.6
Jake helps a supposedly reformed cat burglar investigate a theft for which he's been accused and reunite with his estranged teenage son.
40	6	"It All Depends on You"	Michael Lange	David Moessinger	November 1, 1989	20.7
After Derek blows his first big case for McCabe, Jake starts his own investigation of the defendant.
41	7	"Out of Nowhere"	John Llewellyn Moxey	Jeri Taylor	November 8, 1989	19.9
McCabe meets his match in a gruff Government agent bent on catching a drug dealer, while Jake learns that an old lover is involved in the case.
42	8	"Sweet Leilani"	Russ Mayberry	Rick Mittleman	November 15, 1989	19.5
A friend of McCabe's who's a gossip columnist puts her "Honolulu Hunks" story on hold to learn the truth about a woman's murder when the deceased's body washes up on the beach.
43	9	"My Shining Hour"	Bernard L. Kowalski	Kimmer Ringwald	November 29, 1989	20.5
McCabe thinks Jake has his head in the clouds when he defends a former TV hero who's now a drunken pilot and claims to have witnessed a murder.
44	10	"Long Ago and Far Away"	Russ Mayberry	Jack M. Casey	December 6, 1989	17.0
Judge Smithwood receives a death threat when a military man with a mysterious mission arrives in Hawaii.
45	11	"What Child Is This?"	Reza Badiyi	Jeri Taylor	December 13, 1989	20.1
While McCabe helps out at a homeless shelter for the holidays, he talks Jake into helping a pregnant woman on the run.
46	12	"In the Still of the Night"	Georg Fenady	Carol Saraceno	January 3, 1990	20.0
Derek sees an old friend who's gotten mixed up in murder as well as the monied shenanigans of her unpredictable husband's wealthy clan.
47	13	"You Turned the Tables on Me"	Reza Badiyi	Robert Hamilton	January 10, 1990	22.3
A successful prosecutor gives credit to her lover, a mob boss, for her conviction record and to Jake for unknowingly identifying the mob's snitch.
48	14	"One More for the Road"	Russ Mayberry	Carol Saraceno	January 17, 1990	20.3
Derek is involved in a hit-and-run accident putting McCabe in charge of the investigation and Jake in charge of the evidence.
49	15	"Who's Sorry Now?"	Reza Badiyi	J. Michael Straczynski	January 31, 1990	15.0
A cop from the LAPD is all that stands between McCabe and an execution when the man he's pursued to Hawaii kidnaps the Fatman.
50	16	"I'll Dance at Your Wedding"	Georg Fenady	Paul David Dugan	February 7, 1990	19.5
Jake returns home for his sister's wedding, only to learn that her fiance has connections to the mob.
51	17	"My Buddy"	Bernard L. Kowalski	Robin Madden	February 14, 1990	20.2
An urchin steals Jake's wallet – and his heart – before she and her friends steal a counterfeiter's plates.
52	18	"By Myself"	Chuck Bowman	Jo William Philipp	February 28, 1990	18.0
McCabe personally hunts down a serial rapist whose latest victim is Max's obedience trainer, whom the Fatman has fallen for.
53	19	"I Ain't Got No Body"	Georg Fenady	J. Michael Straczynski	March 7, 1990	17.4
Jake and a former lover, who's a fellow cop, pose as a married couple to investigate suspicious deaths at a health spa.
54	20	"Put Your Dreams Away"	Reza Badiyi	Steven Aspis	March 14, 1990	18.1
Jake gets wounded during a fight in which the pilot of a small plane falls out, so he attempts to stay aloft – and alert – as McCabe tries to talk them down, while the two remember past experiences.
55	21	"If I Didn't Care"	John C. Flinn III	Kimmer Ringwald	March 28, 1990	18.3
Jake's old high school friend has come to kill him in order to pay back a gangster.
56	22	"You're Driving Me Crazy"	Ronald Gary Stein	Michele Val Jean	April 4, 1990	18.6
A husband pleads temporary insanity after brutally stabbing his wife, but Jake and McCabe suspect he had method to madness.
57	23	"You Took Advantage of Me"	Bernard L. Kowalski	Robert Schlitt	April 25, 1990	17.0
Jake goes undercover as a chauffeur to nab a husband for murder, but gets into trouble with the new wife.
58	24	"My Heart Belongs to Daddy"	Robert Scheerer	Douglas Benton & Daniel Benton	May 2, 1990	18.2
A young woman claims to be McCabes daughter while Jake and Derek deal with a frightened witness.
59	25	"Danny Boy"	Russ Mayberry	J. Michael Straczynski	May 9, 1990	17.4
McCabe's bottled-up feelings are unleashed when he's called to the state prison where his inmate son witnessed a murder.
60	26	"Chinatown, My Chinatown"	Reza Badiyi	David Moessinger	May 16, 1990	12.7
The prime suspect in the attempted murder of a young cop is his own father, the head of a Chinatown syndicate.

=== Season 4 (1990–91) ===
The nineteenth episode of the season, "It Never Entered My Mind", served as a back-door pilot for Diagnosis: Murder.

No. overall	No. in season	Title	Directed by	Written by	Original release date	U.S. viewers (millions)
61	1	"God Bless the Child"	E.W. Swackhamer	David Abramowitz	September 12, 1990	17.6
A pair of spoiled children murder their wealthy father – who's one of McCabe's poker buddies – and frame a businessman for the crime.
62	2	"The Tender Trap"	Michael Lange	Michele Val Jean	September 19, 1990	20.7
Derek suspects his uncle's fiancee is a black widow, and she may have already spun her web.
63	3	"Exactly Like You"	Ron Satlof	William Conway	September 26, 1990	18.5
A man confesses to murdering the banker who turned him down for a loan, but McCabe doesn't think the confession adds up.
64	4	"'Round Midnight"	Ron Satlof	S : Robert Hamilton; T : Kimmer Ringwald	October 3, 1990	18.4
In order to catch an elusive jewel thief, Jake poses as the burglar-alarm expert the thief requires for a job that's yet to be disclosed.
65	5	"Only You"	Ron Satlof	Carol Saraceno	October 24, 1990	17.6
Jake's growing attraction to a friend could prove fatal when she interferes in his investigation of an industrial-espionage ring.
66	6	"My Boy Bill"	Reza Badiyi	David Abramowitz	October 31, 1990	17.8
Sailors turned jewelry thieves abduct the son of the prosecuting attorney, and it's up to Jake to rescue him.
67	7	"More Than You Know"	Bernard L. Kowalski	Paul Robert Coyle	November 7, 1990	19.8
After a journalist is dumped by her lover, she murders his wife and makes it look like the work of a serial killer.
68	8	"Night and Day"	Michael Lange	S : Dean Hargrove & Joel Steiger; T : Joyce Burditt	November 14, 1990	18.4
A hard-boiled PI is determined to make a case against the smuggler who shot her husband, whether Jake helps her or not.
69	9	"Goodbye"	Bernard L. Kowalski	T : William Conway; S/T : J. Michael Straczynski	November 28, 1990	19.8
70	10	"Goodbye"	Bernard L. Kowalski	T : William Conway; S/T : J. Michael Straczynski	November 28, 1990	19.8
Jake follows a trail of dirty cops and dead drug dealers to the Mainland where he encounters old friends and new foes, so McCabe follows him to help out.
71	11	"I Know That You Know"	Russ Mayberry	Robin Madden	December 12, 1990	17.2
McCabe helps convict a burglar for the murder of an art collector, but further investigation of the case reveals that it also involves fraud and adultery.
72	12	"Let's Call the Whole Thing Off"	Daniel Attias	Robert Brennan	January 2, 1991	19.9
Jake tries to get a reluctant witness to testify against a mob boss in court before McCabe's deadline passes.
73	13	"I May Be Wrong"	Leo Penn	Robert Brennan	January 9, 1991	14.3
A cop and a pro-apartheid leader, each from South Africa, blame each other for the murder of a government official, also from South Africa – and Jake must found out who's the real killer.
74	14	"Daddy's Home"	Bernard L. Kowalski	Kimmer Ringwald	February 6, 1991	17.4
Jake's father returns after deserting years ago, and he brings emotional upheaval and a threat from thugs with him.
75	15	"I'm Gonna Live Till I Die"	Alexander Singer	William Conway	February 13, 1991	18.7
A mousy bookkeeper who's been poisoned spends his last days helping Jake find the rat who did it.
76	16	"Pretty Baby"	John C. Flinn III	Robin Madden	February 27, 1991	19.0
Jake, McCabe and Derek take turns looking after a baby while they search for the infant's mother who witnessed a murder.
77	17	"I Cover the Waterfront"	Harry Harris	David Abramowitz	March 6, 1991	14.0
Derek goes down to the docks to investigate the death of his longshoreman friend, certain that the man has been murdered.
78	18	"You Don't Know Me"	Reza Badiyi	Eric Estrin & Michael Berlin	March 13, 1991	16.3
An old friend of McCabe's is suspected of murdering the man who took away his business and had an affair with his wife, but he's got the Fatman as an airtight alibi.
79	19	"It Never Entered My Mind"	Bernard L. Kowalski	Joyce Burditt	March 20, 1991	19.7
A doctor is accused of murdering a hospital administrator, so he starts his own investigation with the help of his med students. Note: This episode introduces Dr. Mark Sloan (Dick Van Dyke) and sets up the spin-off series Diagnosis: Murder.
80	20	"Second Time Around"	Michael Lange	S : Paul Schiffer; T : Kimmer Ringwald	April 3, 1991	14.2
A woman's elaborate scheme to fake the death of her blackmailed partner has one fatal flaw – McCabe seeing the man alive.
81	21	"I'd Do Anything"	Ronald Gary Stein	David Abramowitz & William Conway	April 10, 1991	21.5
A psychiatrist manipulates her teenage lover into murdering her husband, then tries to use his fragile state of mind to get them both off the hook.
82	22	"We'll Meet Again"	Bernard L. Kowalski	William Conway	April 24, 1991	14.4
A clown comes after McCabe with a sawed-off shotgun, leading the Fatman to remember all the suspects he convicted.
83	23	"It's a Sin to Tell a Lie"	Georg Fenady	David Abramowitz	May 1, 1991	15.8
McCabe tries to clear his pastor of murdering his mistress.
84	24	"Nevertheless"	Alexander Singer	Robert Brennan	May 8, 1991	16.5
A man murders his wealthy wife and makes it look like a mugging, so McCabe has his star witness help crack the case.

=== Season 5 (1991–92) ===
No. overall	No. in season	Title	Directed by	Written by	Original release date	U.S. viewers (millions)
85	1	"Where or When: Part 1"	Bernard L. Kowalski	Kimmer Ringwald	September 18, 1991	18.5
Jake helps out a boozy PI who swears he wasn't drunk when a murder victim fell into his arms, even though the body disappears.
86	2	"Where or When: Part 2"	Bernard L. Kowalski	Kimmer Ringwald	September 25, 1991	17.4
While working undercover as an arms dealer to get the proof needed for Delaney's case, Jake ends up sleeping with the buyer.
87	3	"Street of Dreams"	Reza Badiyi	Douglas Stefen Borghi	October 30, 1991	16.9
A young graffiti artist witnesses a murder and subsequently finds himself in danger when the killers recognize him.
88	4	"I'll Never Be the Same"	Peter Ellis	Kimmer Ringwald	November 6, 1991	14.2
Jake feels distraught over accidentally shooting a 14-year-old boy, but an Internal Affairs cop tells him to cool it when her own investigation heats up.
89	5	"I Could Write a Book"	James Frawley	Barry M. Schkolnick	November 13, 1991	16.1
McCabe concocts a way to solve the murder of an author, whose ex-wife wanted to stop the publishing of his latest novel – a roman à clef.
90	6	"Two Different Worlds"	Georg Fenady	E. Nick Alexander	November 20, 1991	16.8
Jake deals with a case of serious sibling rivalry when a mentally disturbed woman hires an equally disturbed man to murder her twin sister.
91	7	"Every Time We Say Goodbye"	Georg Fenady	Michael Part & Sam Bernard	December 11, 1991	18.3
A new investigator named Neely goes undercover to catch the man who murdered her model friend.
92	8	"Come Along with Me"	Bernard L. Kowalski	Douglas Stefen Borghi	December 18, 1991	16.8
Neely teams up with Jake to probe a series of murders connected to an organ-theft plot on behalf of a rich man who needs a new liver.
93	9	"Last Dance"	Alexander Singer	James Kearns	January 1, 1992	20.1
A last-minute confession casts doubt on the guilt of the man McCabe is trying for murder.
94	10	"Come Closer to Me"	Frank Thackery	Doc Barnett	January 8, 1992	18.2
Jake goes undercover with a group of thieves to find out a hit man's next victim.
95	11	"Since I Fell for You"	Alexander Singer	Morgan Gendel	January 15, 1992	19.4
An old girlfriend Derek thought was dead comes back into his life, hoping he can protect her from the gangsters who are after her.
96	12	"Just You, Just Me"	Richard Lang	S : Larry Barber & Paul Barber; S/T : Kimmer Ringwald & Bernie Kowalski	January 22, 1992	18.2
Jake gets close to a handicapped store owner who defies a street gang's threat.
97	13	"Stormy Weather: Part 1"	Christian I. Nyby II	S : Joel Steiger & George Eckstein; T : Gerry Conway	January 29, 1992	14.2
Jake competes with a reporter over leads in the case of a ritualistic murder.
98	14	"Stormy Weather: Part 2"	Christian I. Nyby II	S : Joel Steiger & George Eckstein; T : Gerry Conway	February 5, 1992	16.6
Jake identifies the murderer while McCabe is on the ropes.
99	15	"You'll Never Know"	Ritchie Forrest	Douglas Stefen Borghi	February 26, 1992	15.0
A city-councilman friend of Jake's is the prime suspect in a murder case.
100	16	"There'll Be Some Changes Made"	John C. Flinn III	Douglas Stefen Borghi	March 11, 1992	15.3
A singer dealing with substance abuse attempts to get her career back on track, but she's being stalked by a murderer.
101	17	"Pennies from Heaven"	Reza Badiyi	Kimmer Ringwald	March 18, 1992	17.1
Jake tries to find a happy ending for the "Fairy Godmother", who's been giving money from a bank robber's loot to the homeless.
102	18	"I Can't Believe I'm Losing You"	Ronald Gary Stein	S : Joel Steiger; T : Gerry Conway	March 25, 1992	18.4
In this clip show, Jake and Derek review possible suspects when Jake's girlfriend is injured in a bomb blast.
103	19	"All Through the Night"	Frank Thackery	Doc Barnett	April 1, 1992	18.7
A psychiatrist convicted of patient abuse attempts to drive Neely to suicide for revenge.
104	20	"Ain't Misbehavin'"	Christopher Hibler	Bruce Franklin Singer	April 8, 1992	16.9
A bondswoman named Ethel Mae Haven uses disguise to bail her client out of a murder charge when his life is threatened.
105	21	"Nightmare"	John C. Flinn III	T : Al Martinez; S/T : Christian Darren	April 22, 1992	17.6
A former football player turned cop teams up with Jake to catch a serial killer.
106	22	"Beautiful Dreamer" "Mickey Daytona"	Bernard L. Kowalski	David J. Burke	May 6, 1992	18.1
A cop will not rest until he takes down the kinky killer-rapist who's giving his victims nightmares.
