= Marisa Tomei =

American actress (born 1964)

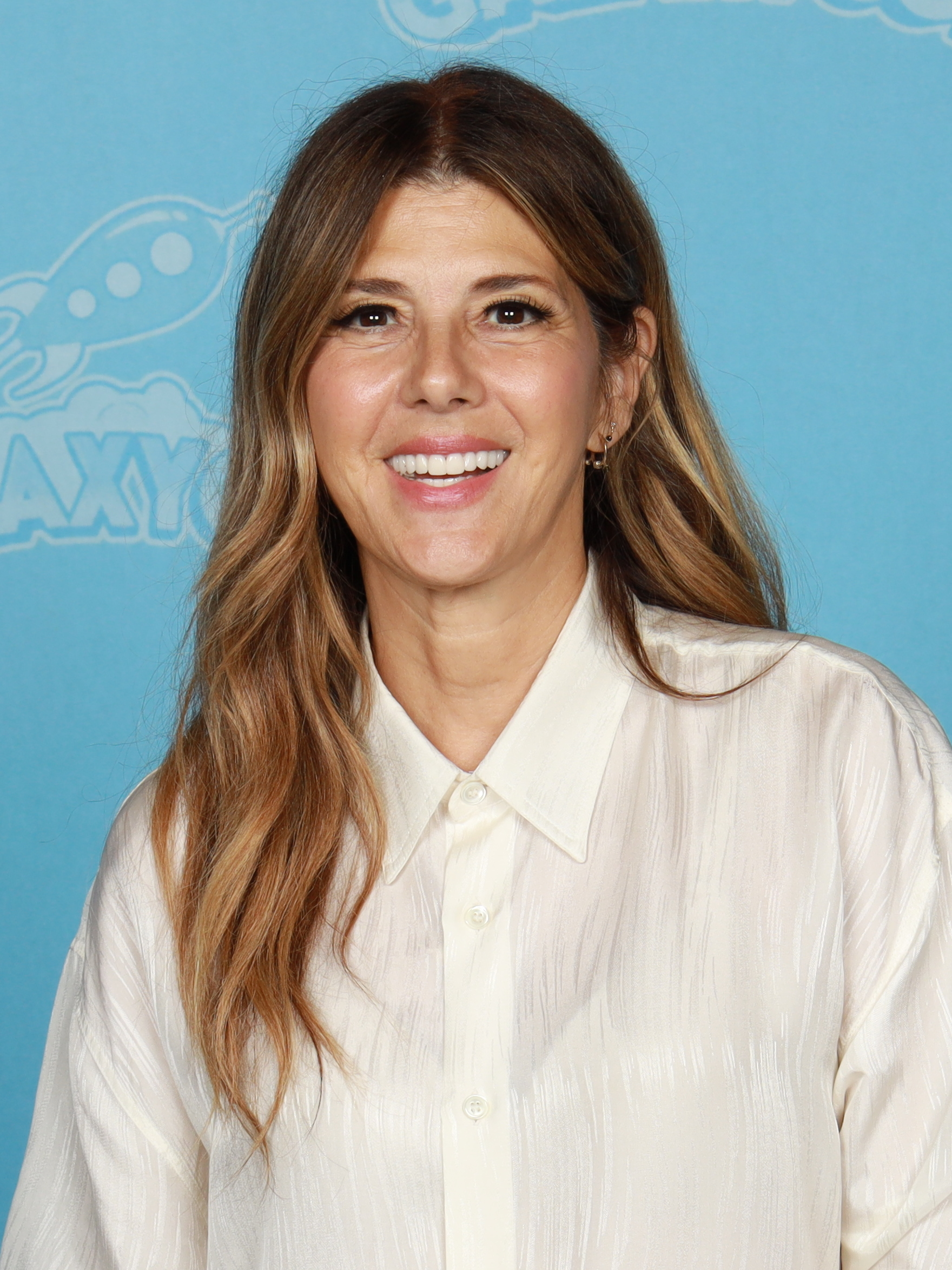
- Tomei at the 2024 Raleigh GalaxyCon
- Born: December 4, 1964 (age 61); Brooklyn, New York, U.S.
- Citizenship: United States, Italy
- Education: Boston University
- Occupation: Actress
- Years active: 1983–present
- Works: Full list
- Awards: Full list

Marisa Tomei (/toʊˈmeɪ/, Italian: [toˈmɛi]; born December 4, 1964) is an American actress. She gained prominence for her comedic performance in My Cousin Vinny (1992), which earned her the Academy Award for Best Supporting Actress. She received further nominations in the category for In the Bedroom (2001) and The Wrestler (2008).

Her early appearances were in the soap opera As the World Turns (1983–1985) and the first season of the sitcom A Different World (1987). Tomei's other notable films include Chaplin (1992), The Paper (1994), What Women Want (2000), Danika (2006), Before the Devil Knows You're Dead (2007), Wild Hogs (2007), The Wrestler (2008), The Ides of March (2011), Crazy, Stupid, Love (2011), Parental Guidance (2012), The Big Short (2015), and The King of Staten Island (2020). She also portrayed May Parker in the Marvel Cinematic Universe, from Captain America: Civil War (2016) to Spider-Man: Brand New Day (2026).

Tomei was a founding member of the Naked Angels Theater Company. She appeared in John Morgan Evans's Daughters (1986) off-Broadway before making her Broadway debut in Wait Until Dark opposite Quentin Tarantino (1998). She earned a nomination for the Drama Desk Award for Outstanding Featured Actress in a Play for her role in Top Girls (2008), and a special Drama Desk Award for Will Eno's The Realistic Joneses (2014). She returned to Broadway in the revival of The Rose Tattoo in 2019.

== Early life ==
Marisa Tomei was born on December 4, 1964, in Brooklyn, New York, to Gary A. Tomei, a trial lawyer, and Adelaide (née Bianchi), an English teacher. She has a younger brother, actor Adam Tomei, and was partly raised by her paternal grandparents. Tomei's parents are both of Italian descent; her father's ancestors came from Tuscany, Calabria, and Campania, while her mother's ancestors are from Tuscany and Sicily. She said in 2019 that her family celebrated many Italian traditions but was not religious. She graduated from Edward R. Murrow High School in 1982.

Tomei grew up in the Midwood neighborhood of Brooklyn. While there, she became captivated by the Broadway shows to which her theater-loving parents took her and was drawn to acting as a career. At Andries Hudde Junior High School, she played Hedy LaRue in a school production of How to Succeed in Business Without Really Trying. She also attended Albee School of Dance. After graduating from high school, she attended Boston University for a year.

== Career ==
=== 1983–1991: Early acting roles ===
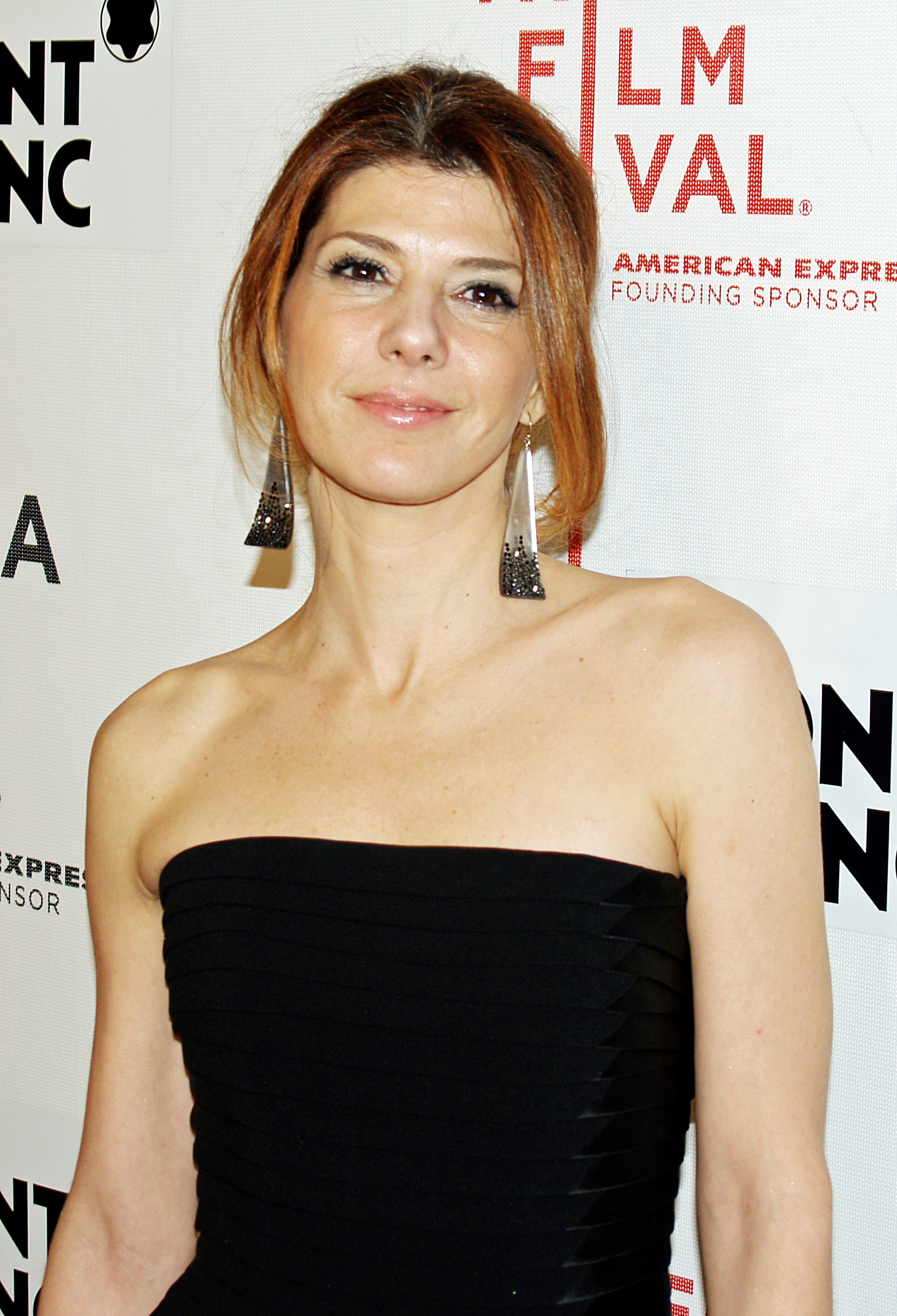
Tomei at the premiere of War, Inc. (2008) at the Tribeca Film Festival

Tomei followed up As the World Turns in 1987 with a main role on the sitcom A Different World as Maggie Lauten during the first season. Her film debut was a minor role in the 1984 comedy film The Flamingo Kid, in which she played Mandy, a waitress. She had only one line in the film. In 1986 she had a small role in the Bob and Harvey Weinstein directed comedy film Playing for Keeps which was a financial and critical failure.

During this phase, she made her stage debut in 1987 at the age of 22 in the off-Broadway play Daughters, playing Cetta. The role earned her rave reviews and the Theatre World Award for outstanding debut on stage. She continued to take roles off-Broadway in the plays Beirut in 1987, Sharon and Billy in 1988, and What the Butler Saw in 1989. She also portrayed Rosa Delle Rose in The Rose Tattoo at the Williamstown Theatre Festival. She took more prominent roles opposite Sylvester Stallone in the comedy Oscar (1991), and Nicolas Cage in the erotic thriller Zandalee (1991).

=== 1992–1999: Breakthrough and acclaim ===
Following several small films, including Oscar, Tomei came to international prominence with her comedic performance as Mona Lisa Vito in the 1992 film My Cousin Vinny starring opposite Joe Pesci, for which she received critical praise. Critic Vincent Canby wrote, "Ms. Tomei gives every indication of being a fine comedian, whether towering over Mr. Pesci and trying to look small, or arguing about a leaky faucet in terms that demonstrate her knowledge of plumbing. Mona Lisa is also a first-rate auto mechanic, which comes in handy in the untying of the knotted story." For her performance, Tomei won Best Supporting Actress at the 1993 Academy Awards, prevailing over Miranda Richardson, Joan Plowright, Vanessa Redgrave and Judy Davis.

American film critic Rex Reed created controversy (and a minor Hollywood myth) when he suggested that Jack Palance had announced the wrong name after opening the envelope. While this allegation was repeatedly disproved, even the Academy officially denied it, Tomei called the story "extremely hurtful". A Price Waterhouse accountant explained that if such an event had occurred, "we have an agreement with the academy that one of us would step on stage, introduce ourselves, and say the presenter misspoke." In 2015, when The Hollywood Reporter polled hundreds of academy members, asking them to re-vote on some past decisions, academy members indicated that, given a second chance, they would still award the 1992 Best Supporting Actress award to Tomei.

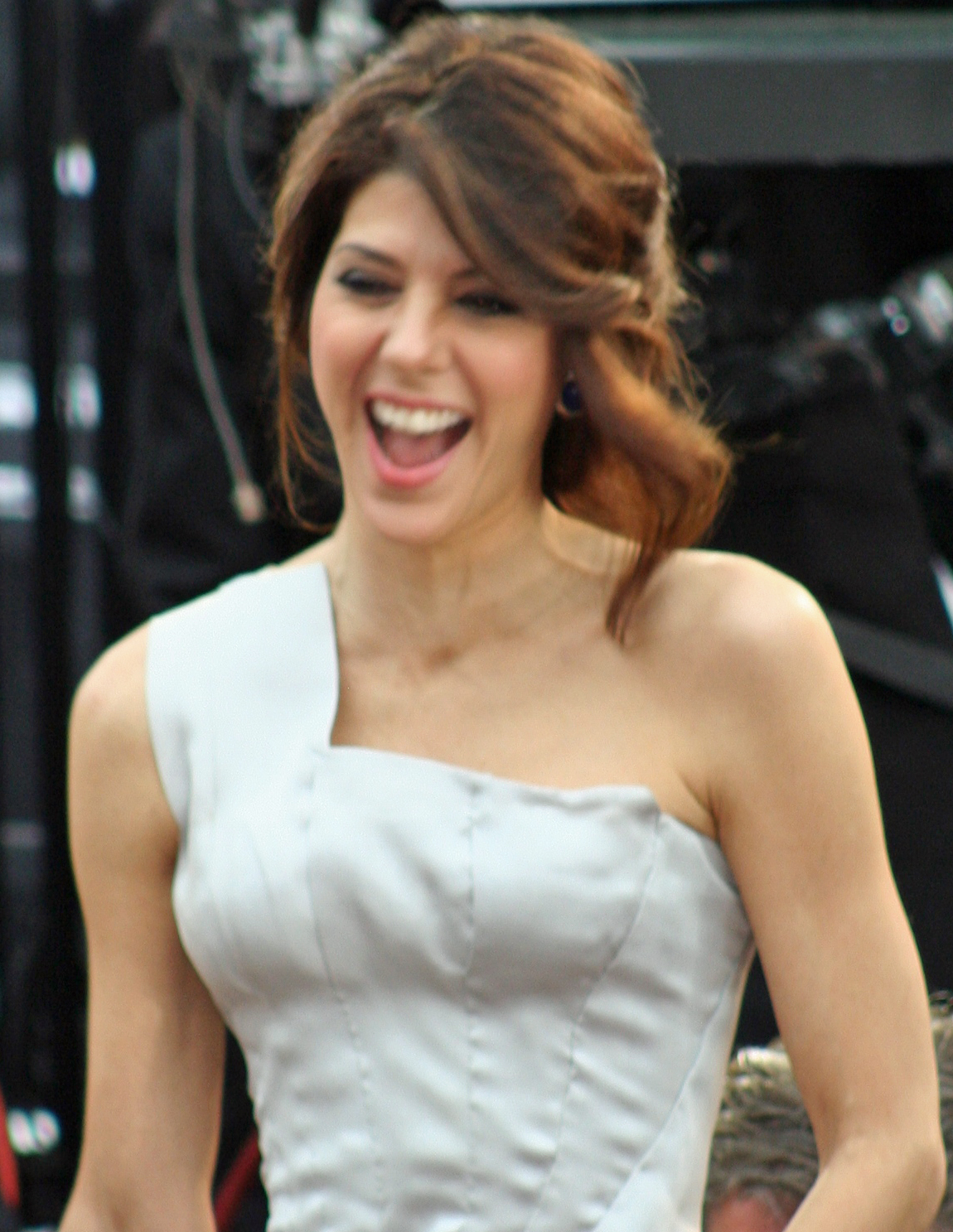
Tomei at the 81st Academy Awards in 2009, where she received her third Academy Award nomination for The Wrestler

After her Oscar win, Tomei appeared as silent film star Mabel Normand in the film Chaplin, with her then-boyfriend Robert Downey Jr. playing Charlie Chaplin. The following year, she starred in the romantic drama Untamed Heart with Christian Slater, for which they won the MTV Movie Award for Best Kiss. Tomei had won the previous year for Best Breakthrough Performance for My Cousin Vinny. The next year, Tomei played a pregnant journalist in the comedy-drama The Paper, and appeared alongside Downey again in the romantic comedy Only You. She then appeared in Nick Cassavetes' Unhook the Stars. Of Tomei's performance, Stephen Holden of The New York Times compared her favorably to the film's star, Gena Rowlands, writing, "Ms. Tomei is equally fine as Mildred's [Rowlands's character's] younger, hot-tempered neighbor, whose raw working-class feistiness and bluntly profane vocabulary initially repel the genteel older woman." She received her first Screen Actors Guild award nomination for Outstanding Female Supporting Actor for her performance.

In 1998, she was nominated for the American Comedy Award for Funniest Supporting Actress for Tamara Jenkins's cult film Slums of Beverly Hills. The independent feature was well received by critics and the public, with Janet Maslin of The New York Times writing, "Jenkins makes the most of an especially ingratiating cast, with Ms. Tomei very charming and funny as Rita," and Emanuel Levy of Variety describing Tomei as "spunky and sexy... more subdued than she usually is." Tomei spent several years away from high-profile roles and major motion pictures in the late 1990s before rising again to prominence in the early 2000s.

During the 1990s, Tomei made several television appearances. In 1996, she made a guest appearance on the sitcom Seinfeld, playing herself in the two-part episode "The Cadillac". In the episode, George Costanza attempts to get a date with her through a friend of Elaine Benes. She also made an appearance on The Simpsons as movie star Sara Sloane, who falls in love with Ned Flanders. Former Saturday Night Live cast member Jay Mohr wrote in his book Gasping for Airtime that, as guest host in October 1994, Tomei insisted that the proposed sketch "Good Morning Brooklyn" not be used because she did not like the idea of being stereotyped. This displeased SNL's writers and performers given the show's penchant for satirizing celebrities. Tomei parodied her My Cousin Vinny role and its considerable Brooklyn influence in a skit spoofing the 1995 O.J. Simpson murder trial.

In 1998 she made her Broadway debut playing Susy Hendrix in the revival of the Frederick Knott play Wait Until Dark, acting opposite Quentin Tarantino at the Brooks Atkinson Theatre. Ben Brantley of The New York Times compared her performance unfavorably to Audrey Hepburn who played the role in the 1967 film. Brantley wrote, "[Tomei]'s a fine, vibrant actress, and heaven knows she works hard here, but she isn't well cast. The appeal of [Hepburn] in the part was of seeing her fragile, ladylike persona turn tough and muscular, and Ms. Tomei's performance allows for no similar transition". Matt Wolf of Variety wrote "Tomei gives a likable, if not wildly interesting performance".

=== 2000–2009: Established actress ===
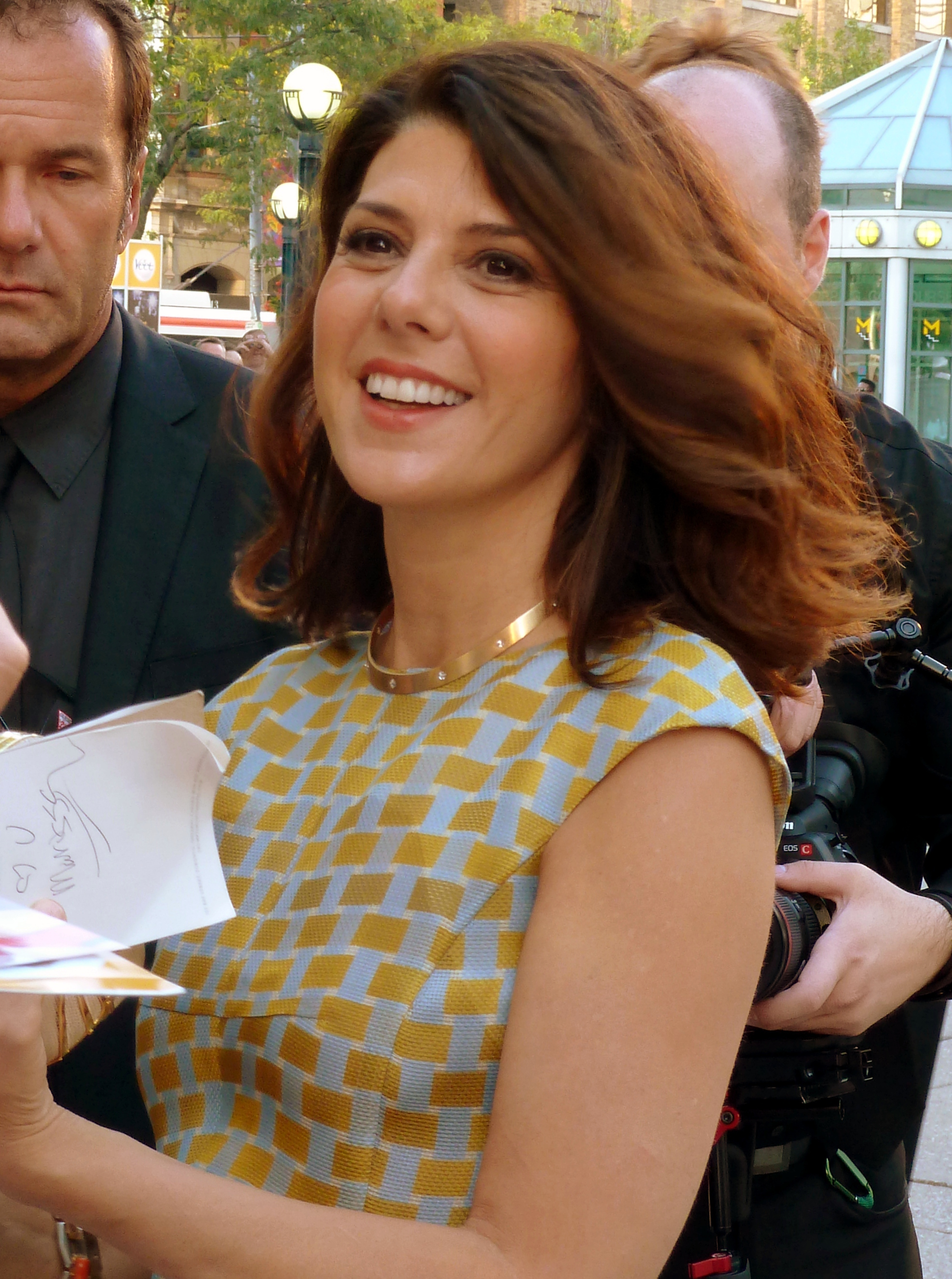
Tomei attending the premiere of Inescapable at the 2012 Toronto International Film Festival

Tomei appeared in the Nancy Meyers directed comedy What Women Want starring Mel Gibson and Helen Hunt. The film was a commercial success. She also had a supporting role in the romantic comedy Someone Like You starring Ashley Judd, Hugh Jackman, and Greg Kinnear.

In 2001, she appeared in Todd Field's In the Bedroom starring Tom Wilkinson and Sissy Spacek. The film earned a Best Picture nomination. Tomei herself earned several awards including a ShoWest Award for Best Supporting Actress in 2002. Variety wrote, "Tomei is winning in what is surely her most naturalistic and unaffected performance," while The New York Times writer Stephen Holden exclaimed, "Ms. Tomei's ruined, sorrowful Natalie is easily her finest screen role." In the Bedroom earned Tomei a second Academy Award nomination and her first Golden Globe Award nomination. Tomei also shared a Screen Actors Guild Award nomination for Outstanding Performance by a Cast.

In 2002, she appeared in the Bollywood-inspired film The Guru and voiced the role of Bree Blackburn, one of the two main antagonists in the animated feature film The Wild Thornberrys Movie. In 2003, Tomei appeared in one of her biggest commercial hits the comedy Anger Management starring Jack Nicholson and Adam Sandler. The following year, she appeared in the film Alfie with Jude Law, based on the 1966 British film of the same name. In 2006, Tomei had a recurring role in Rescue Me, playing Johnny Gavin's ex-wife Angie. She won a Gracie Allen Award for Supporting Actress in a Drama Series for her work in the four episodes in which she appeared. The following year, she appeared in the comedy Wild Hogs (2007). The film was the 13th-highest-grossing movie of 2007 ($168,273,550 domestic box office). She also starred in the independent drama film Grace is Gone starring John Cusack, and the Sidney Lumet-directed Before the Devil Knows You're Dead starring Philip Seymour Hoffman and Ethan Hawke.

In 2008, Tomei played Cassidy/Pam, a struggling stripper, in the Darren Aronofsky film The Wrestler. She appeared in several nude dance numbers in the film. Aronofsky said, "This role shows how courageous and brave Marisa is. And ultimately she's really sexy. We knew nudity was a big part of the picture, and she wanted to be that exposed and vulnerable." Numerous critics heralded this performance as a standout in her career. The Hollywood Reporter wrote, "Tomei delivers one of her most arresting performances, again without any trace of vanity." Ty Burr of The Boston Globe wrote, "Tomei gives a brave and scrupulously honest performance, one that's most naked when Pam has her clothes on." Variety exclaimed, "Tomei is in top, emotionally forthright form as she charts a life passage similar to Pam's." For her performance she was nominated for her first BAFTA, second Golden Globe and third Academy Award. In 2009, Tomei recorded the role of Mary Magdalene in Thomas Nelson's audio Bible production The Word of Promise.

=== 2010–present: Supporting roles ===
In 2010, Tomei appeared in Cyrus, a comedy-drama co-starring John C. Reilly and Jonah Hill. Tomei hosted the 2011 Scientific and Technical Awards, which was followed by an appearance at the 83rd Academy Awards. She starred in the mystery-suspense film The Lincoln Lawyer. She also appeared in Salvation Boulevard, which premiered at the 2011 Sundance Film Festival. Tomei's other 2011 films included Crazy, Stupid, Love and the George Clooney film The Ides of March. The same year, Lady Gaga said in an interview she would want Tomei to portray her in a film about the singer. Tomei responded, "I was thrilled when I heard. I love her. I love her music. And she's an awesome businesswoman. So I was so touched, really. I think it's incredible that she likes my work and that she'd think of me."

Tomei was featured in the second episode of the third season of NBC's Who Do You Think You Are?, on February 10, 2012. In the episode, she traveled to Tuscany and to the island of Elba to uncover the truth about the 100-year-old murder of her great-grandfather, Francesco Leopoldo Bianchi. Tomei portrayed a single mom back in school at Binghamton University taking a class taught by Hugh Grant in Marc Lawrence's 2014 written and directed The Rewrite. She also starred in the Ira Sachs drama Love Is Strange (2014) alongside Alfred Molina and John Lithgow. That same year she appeared on Broadway in the Will Eno play The Realistic Joneses starring alongside Tracy Letts, Michael C. Hall, and Toni Collette. Charles Isherwood of The New York Times wrote, "Ms. Tomei radiates chipper energy...[with] an air of desperate cheeriness that keeps faltering, like a sparkler sputtering in the dark."

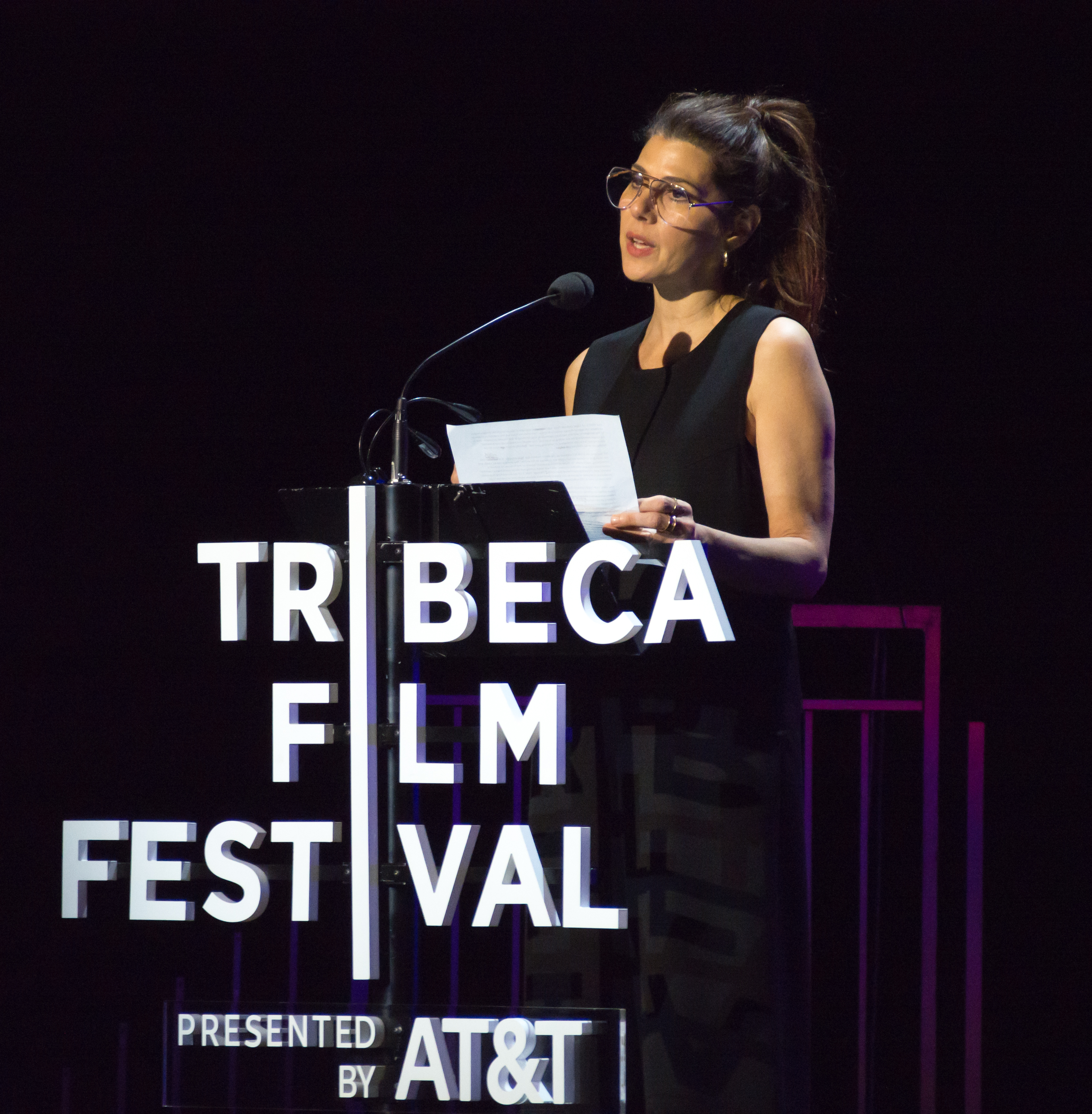
Tomei at the Tribeca Film Festival in 2018

During this time she portrayed Aunt May in the Marvel Cinematic Universe, appearing in Captain America: Civil War (2016), Spider-Man: Homecoming (2017), Avengers: Endgame (2019), Spider-Man: Far From Home (2019), Spider-Man: No Way Home (2021), and Spider-Man: Brand New Day (2026). She also took roles in the crime drama The Big Short (2015), the horror film The First Purge (2018), and the comedy-drama The King of Staten Island (2020). Tomei returned to Broadway in the revival of The Rose Tattoo at the American Airlines Theatre. She reprised the role of Serafina Delle Rose which she previously played off-Broadway. Alexis Soloski of The Guardian wrote, "Past productions have starred actors with a heft of gravitas – Anna Magnani, Mercedes Ruehl, Maureen Stapleton – women who may have given the gags somewhere weightier to land. Tomei is a lighter, flightier presence – sensuous and delightful – and she plays even the darkest moments brightly, in on the joke."

In 2018 she had a guest spot in the second season of the Hulu dystopian series The Handmaid's Tale playing Mrs. O'Connor. She was also cast to play All in the Family's Edith Bunker in ABC's Live in Front of a Studio Audience specials in 2019 and 2020. In 2023 she starred in the Rebecca Miller-directed romantic comedy She Came to Me opposite Peter Dinklage and Anne Hathaway, which premiered at the 73rd Berlin International Film Festival. She took a supporting role in the Amazon Prime Video romantic comedy Upgraded starring Camila Mendes.

She is slated to star in the action thriller The Mongoose alongside Liam Neeson and Ving Rhames, and the romantic comedy F*ck Valentine's Day.

== Public image ==
Tomei has been highly ranked on various magazines' most attractive lists. In 2009, Tomei was placed at number 18 on the FHM's 100 Sexiest Women list.

During her career, Tomei has appeared on the cover of numerous lifestyle and fashion magazines, such as Paper, Shape, Gotham, Vogue Greece, More, and Redbook.

In 2005, she was featured in an advertising campaign and a television commercial for clothing retailer Hanes alongside Michael Jordan, Damon Wayans, and Matthew Perry. She appeared in Céline's fall 2014 campaign, and has also appeared in campaigns for Coach, Band of Outsiders, and Briggs & Riley luggage.

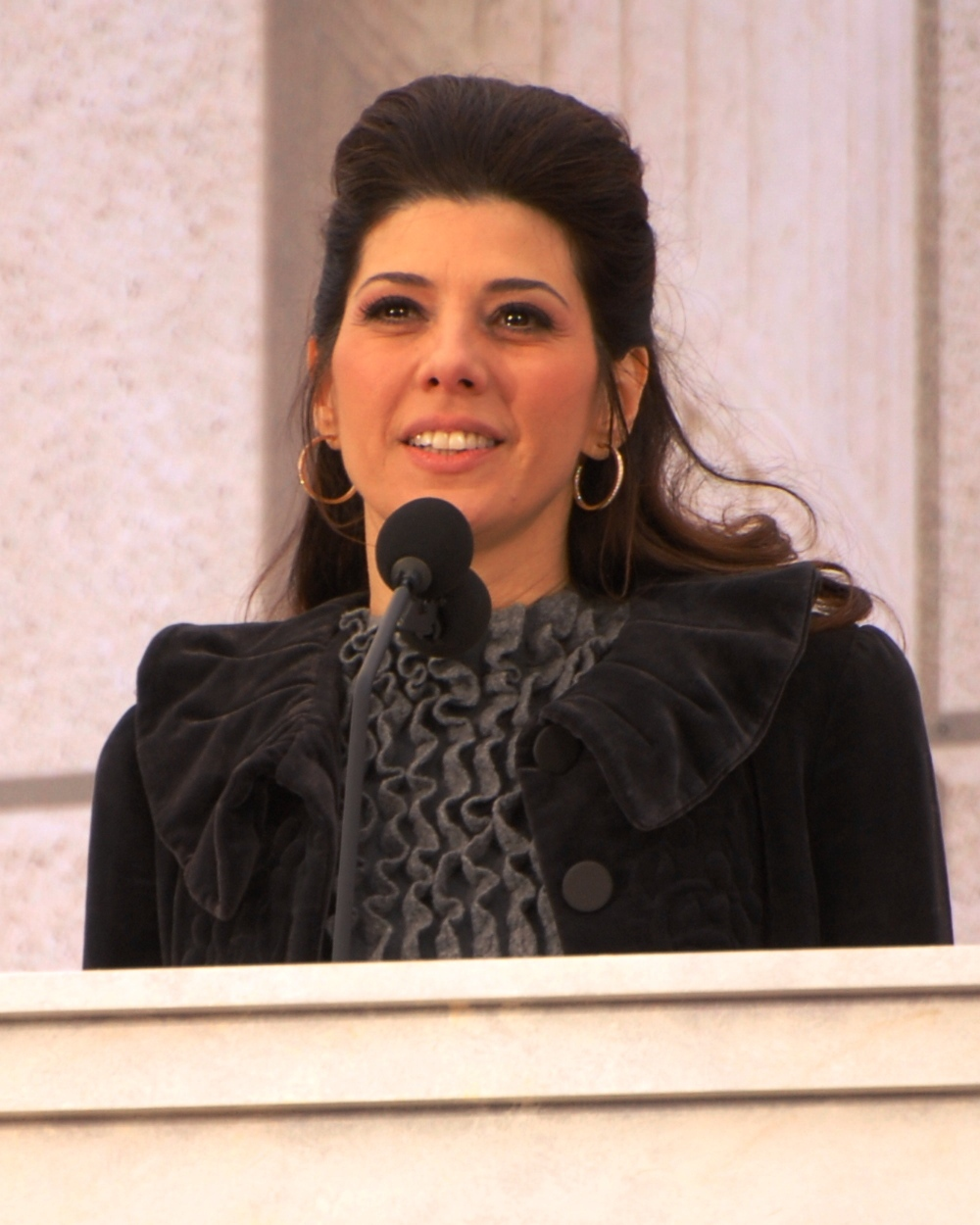
Tomei at the first inauguration of Barack Obama in 2009

== Personal life ==
Tomei briefly dated actor Robert Downey Jr. in the early 1990s. Between 2008 and 2012, Tomei was in a relationship with actor Logan Marshall-Green. They were rumored to be engaged, but a representative for Tomei denied this. Tomei has never been married. Tomei said in 2009, "I'm not that big a fan of marriage as an institution, and I don't know why women need to have children to be seen as complete human beings."

Tomei is godmother to Zoë Kravitz, daughter of her A Different World co-star Lisa Bonet and Lenny Kravitz.

Tomei has supported voting, drawing attention to the Voter ID assistance available through VoteRiders.

Tomei was featured in two programs dealing with genealogical research: Who Do You Think You Are? and the PBS program Finding Your Roots. Researchers mapped out Tomei's family tree and analyzed her DNA.

== Acting credits and accolades ==
Tomei received the Academy Award for Best Supporting Actress for her comedic role in My Cousin Vinny (1992). She was further Oscar-nominated for her roles in the Todd Field drama In the Bedroom (2001) and the Darren Aronofsky drama The Wrestler (2008). She received nominations for a Daytime Emmy Award, two Golden Globe Awards, an Independent Spirit Award, and three Screen Actors Guild Awards.
