= The Cutting Ball Theater =

American theatrical company

Cutting Ball Theater
- Address: 277 Taylor St; San Francisco; United States
- Type: Theatre company

Construction
- Opened: 1999
- Closed: 2024
- Years active: 1999–2024

Cutting Ball Theater was a San Francisco-based theater company. New works performed by Cutting Ball include Bay Area premieres by American playwrights Will Eno and Eugenie Chan. The company closed at the end of 2024.

== History ==
The company was founded in 1999 by theater artist Rob Melrose and artistic director Paige Rogers. The theater, which ran as a collective, closed in 2024 during a series of theater closures in the area. The attendance impacts from the COVID pandemic and the decrease in available grant funding were given as reasons for the demise.

== Productions ==
Cutting Ball Theater premiered and produced a variety of plays, including:

- Lady Grey (in ever lower light) by Will Eno (2011): A collection of short plays exploring themes of identity and human connection.
- Bone to Pick and Diadem by Eugenie Chan (2011): Reimaginings of classical myths through a modern lens.

== Awards and recognition ==
In 2010, Cutting Ball Theater was named "Best Theater Company" in the San Francisco Bay Guardian's "Best of the Bay" issue.

In 2013, the company received the American Theatre Wing's National Theatre Company Grant.
