= Arrested for Driving While Blind =

Single by ZZ Top

from the album Tejas
- A-side: "Arrested for Driving While Blind"
- B-side: "It's Only Love (US); Neighbor, Neighbor (UK)"
- Released: 1977
- Recorded: 1976
- Genre: Texas blues, blues rock
- Length: 3:08
- Label: London Records
- Songwriters: Billy Gibbons, Dusty Hill and Frank Beard
- Producer: Bill Ham

ZZ Top singles chronology
"It's Only Love" (1976)	"Arrested for Driving While Blind" (1977)	"Enjoy and Get It On" (1977)

Official audio
- "Arrested for Driving While Blind" (2019 Remaster) on YouTube

"Arrested for Driving While Blind" is a song by American blues rock band ZZ Top. Written by all three band members Billy Gibbons, Dusty Hill and Frank Beard, it was released as the second single from their fifth studio album Tejas (1976).

== Background and lyric ==
The song ostensibly concerns the pleasures, and legal pitfalls, of driving under the influence, after dark, as an antidote to limited leisure opportunities. The song references a number of popular alcoholic beverage brands:

When you're driving down the highway at night
And you're feelin' that Wild Turkey's bite
Don't give Johnnie Walker a ride
Cause Jack Black is right by your side
You might get taken to the jailhouse and fined
You've been arrested for driving while blind.

In a 1985 interview with Spin magazine, however, bass player Dusty Hill said that the song was not meant to encourage people to drive drunk: "That's not it at all. Billy introduces it: 'Don't get arrested for driving while blind.' We're not saying, 'Don't drink.' We're just doing a tune."

Record World said that "the boogie rhythms and stinging guitar licks leave no doubt but that ZZ Top is driving chartward again."

== Sound mixing ==
The album Tejas was produced by Bill Ham and recorded and mixed by Terry Manning. In 1987, a digitally remixed version of the recording was released on CD and the original 1976 mix version was discontinued. The remix version created controversy among fans because it significantly changed the sound of the instruments, especially the drums. On the original vinyl single release of "Arrested for Driving While Blind", the drum sound is more muted and the lead guitar solo far more prominent. The remixed version cuts off the first two words "And when" of the song's opening line, leaving only "driving down the highway at night... "

== Commercial performance ==
"Arrested for Driving While Blind" peaked at number 91 on the Billboard Hot 100.

== Personnel ==
- Billy Gibbons – guitar, lead vocals
- Dusty Hill – bass
- Frank Beard – drums

== Charts ==
Chart (1977)	Peak position
US Billboard Hot 100	91
US Cash Box Top 100	74
