= Nigel Richards (actor) =

British theatre actor

Nigel Richards is an actor and singer best known in England for his work in musical theatre. Whilst still in training at the Guildhall School of Music & Drama he worked with Leonard Bernstein on the British stage premiere of Bernstein's Mass at the Barbican. He is currently a frequent lecturer on musical theatre in the United States, Malaysia and the United Kingdom.

== Career ==
He spent four years in the Bridewell Theatre Company in the premieres of Floyd Collins (playing Floyd), Hello Again (playing the Senator), Songs for a New World (Man 2), La La LaChiusa, the new Sondheim review, 'The Road You Didn't Take' & The Cutting Edge (which transferred to the Donmar Warehouse). Other premieres include Napoleon (Shaftesbury Theatre), Spend Spend Spend (West Yorkshire Playhouse), Charlotte Salomon:Life Or Theatre (Soho Theatre), Baby (Forum Theatre, Wythenshawe), 10 Plagues (Royal Court Theatre) by Mark Ravenhill & Conor Mitchell co-starring with Marc Almond, The Night Before My Wedding at the Latitude Festival 2014, written by Neil Gaiman and Lance Horne, and the role of Tom, the eponymous Stationmaster in the musical of the same name by Tim Connor and Sue Pearce (Tristan Bates, Covent Garden).

Other forays in the West End include The Phantom in The Phantom of the Opera (Her Majesty's Theatre), Father Dominic in Martin Guerre (Prince Edward Theatre), Grantaire and Enjolras in Les Misérables (Palace Theatre, London) and Dan in Kurt Weill's Songs From A Hotel Bedroom (Royal Opera House).

For over two years he toured in Bob Wilson's production of Tom Waits The Black Rider, taking over the lead role when Marianne Faithfull became indisposed. Work since then has included playing Sienna Miller's father in As You Like It (Wyndhams Theatre), and the revival of Kurt Weill's 1933 Der Silbersee (Silverlake) at the Wexford Festival Opera.

Other theatre work has included: Ghosts (as Oswald opposite Sue Johnson), Macbeth, and Chris Monks' revisionist Mikardo (New Vic, Stoke), Blood Brothers (Olympia, Dublin), The Caucasian Chalk Circle & Cyclops (The Scoop), The Glass Menagerie (Oxford Touring Company- European Tour), Hair (National Tour), Ayckbourne's Me, Myself & I (Orange Tree, Richmond), MTL's The Marriage of Figaro (Drill Hall, Vienna & Stuttgart), and The World Goes Round (Stephen Joseph, Scarborough).

Nigel returned to Scarborough to be directed by Ayckbourne himself in the revival of By Jeeves. Subsequent theatre includes Frederick in A Little Night Music (Frinton), the lead in 'Son of a Preacher Man'(national tour), and The Ghost of Christmas Present for Antic Disposition's 'A Christmas Carol' at Middle Temple.

Richards' occasional TV work includes Holby City, Doctors, Judge John Deed, Moon & Sun (BBC), Virgin Birth (Granada), Sparkle Baby Sparkle (ITV). Richards co-wrote the award-winning short film The Crouch End Negotiator (48 Hour Smoke & Screen Challenge) in 2007 and co-starred in Lucky old Bag the following year. His newest short, Crime Central, was released in 2015.

Having seen Richards in The Black Rider, Scott Walker invited him to appear in London at the Barbican, performing with Jarvis Cocker and Damon Albarn in Drifting and Tilting: The Songs of Scott Walker in the songs Clara, Jolson and Jones, and Farmer in the City. He recorded his debut album in 2009, called A Shining Truth, a collection of previously unrecorded songs by Adam Guettel, Michael John LaChiusa, Conor Mitchell & Others, which was released on 3 August 2009. Prior to the launch Richards played Stryver in the HBO film of A Tale Of Two Cities.

Richards taught 'Acting through song' for 8 years at Arts Educational School in Chiswick, but now teaches around the world under the auspices of Dama Asia, based in Kuala Lumpur, and principally at The University of West London (London School of Music), and at The London School of Musical Theatre as a guest lecturer.

He is Honorary Patron of The Northern Musical Theatre Orchestra (NMTO) and BigLittle Theatre School.
