= Monty Taylor =

American computer programmer

- Born: August 12, 1975 (age 50); Atlanta, Georgia, United States
- Education: B.F.A. Theatre (Directing)
- Alma mater: Abilene Christian University
- Occupation: Software developer
- Employer: Oracle Corporation
- Known for: OpenStack, Drizzle, Mysql
- Website: inaugust.com

Monty Taylor (born 12 August 1975) is a free software hacker, theatre director and lighting designer. He has been named one of the most important people in cloud computing and was featured by Wired as part of 'The New Hackers'.

== Free software ==
=== MySQL ===
Monty was a Senior Consultant at MySQL AB. While there he was a specialist in High Availability and MySQL Cluster which led to the creation of NDB-connector, a set of bindings to the underlying NDB API of MySQL Cluster.

After MySQL was acquired by Sun, Monty joined the team working on Drizzle. which subsequently moved to Rackspace after the Oracle acquisition of Sun.

=== OpenStack ===
While at Rackspace, Monty helped to launch the OpenStack project. He was responsible for the original creation of OpenStack's "Gating" system and is the founder and past PTL of the OpenStack Infra project. He is one of the top overall contributors to OpenStack over the history of the project.

Monty serves as an Individual Member on the OpenStack Foundation board of directors as well as the OpenStack Technical Committee

In 2011, Monty moved from Rackspace to HP. There he formed a team that developed TripleO project for deploying OpenStack which went on to become the basis for the first release of HP's Helion OpenStack and Red Hat's RDO

In 2013, Monty was honored by the Brazilian Government for his contributions to Free Software.

In 2015, Monty moved to IBM to lead the OpenStack Innovation team as a Distinguished Engineer.

From 2016 to 2020, Monty was a Member of Technical Staff at Red Hat working on CI with Zuul and Ansible.

== Theatre ==
Monty started his Theatre career as a stagehand at Stewart Theatre in Raleigh, North Carolina while enrolled at North Carolina State University.

Monty later transferred to Abilene Christian University where he got a BFA in Theatre with a focus on directing. While there, he served as lighting designer and technical director for ACU's Sing Song event. He continued his education in the MFA program at CalArts, but left and moved to Seattle in 2005.

Monty directed a mildly controversial adaptation of Shakespeare's Henry V called King Henry for Ghostlight Theatricals. He was also a frequent collaborator at Taproot Theatre in Seattle, Penfold Theatre in Austin and with The Bengsons on their rock opera Hundred Days in Seattle, New York and San Francisco. In celebration of the first day of legal same-sex marriage in the State of Washington, Monty lit Seattle's City Hall.

Monty is an associate artist with Seattle's The Satori Group. He designed the lighting for all of Satori's productions from 2009–2011. During that time, The Satori Group was runner up for the Seattle Times' "Friskiest Fringe Establishment" award in 2009, and won the "Avant-garde Afterglow" award for their production of and adaptation of George Saunders' short story "Winky".
