= The Satori Group =

Coordinates: 47°35′42″N 122°19′37″W

- Interactive map of The Satori Group
- Location: Seattle, Washington
- Type: Theatre

Construction
- Opened: 2006

Website
- https://www.satori-group.com

The Satori Group is a Seattle-based theatre ensemble that unites innovative multi-media, dynamic physical styles, and contemporary content in live performance.

== History ==
The Satori Group was founded in 2006 in Cincinnati, Ohio, by eleven graduating students of two colleges, the University of Cincinnati – College-Conservatory of Music and Williams College. Their initial production was the original piece iLove:, which premiered at the 2007 Cincinnati Fringe Festival. iLove: earned the Cincinnati Producer’s Pick of the Fringe and was nominated for the Cincinnati Entertainment Award for Best Alternative Production.

Since then, the group has created three original works and presented a wide array of productions. They presented Hello Again at The Hustler Soundstage, and the Regional Premiere productions of The Investigation of the Murder in El Salvador and Never Swim Alone at The Carnegie Visual and Performing Arts Center. Their original work (rsvp) premiered at the 2008 Cincinnati Fringe Festival, earning Cincinnati CityBeat’s Critic’s Pick.

In Spring 2008, The Satori Group relocated to Seattle, Washington. In August 2008 Satori hosted the creators of the Frank Suzuki Aesthetic, John Nobbs and Jacqui Carroll. In March 2009 Satori made its Seattle debut with Will Eno's TRAGEDY: a tragedy.

On August 12, 2009, the group announced their 2009-2010 season, Choose, Witness, Live, which included Artifacts of Consequence, Winky and The Making of a Monster at the Northwest New Works Festival at On The Boards. On January 29th and 30th, 2010, Satori hosted a special presentation of UNDINE by Hand2Mouth Theatre followed by a panel discussion on "New Work in the Pacific Northwest" hosted by Brendan Kiley (The Stranger). Winky received the Seattle Times Footlight Award for Avant-garde Afterglow.

In 2011 Satori presented Fabulous Prizes by Neil Ferron, who was nominated for the Gregory Award for Outstanding Playwright.

== The Company ==
- Artistic Director - Caitlin Sullivan
- Managing Director - Doreen Sayegh
- Programs Manager - Adam Standley
- Company Manager - Lauren Hester
- Members - Adam Standley, Lauren Hester, Caitlin Sullivan, Quinn Franzen, Spike Friedman, Clare Strasser, Kate Sumpter, Greta Wilson, Alex Matthews, Greta Wilson, LoraBeth Barr, Liza Curtiss
- Associate Members - Lindsey Valitchka, Carol Thompson, Antoniette Bianco, John Leith, Montana Tippet, Nathan Sorseth, Martyna Majok, Kristyne A. Hughes, Monty Taylor, Neil Ferron
- Founding Members - Adrienne Clark, Anthony Darnell, Andrew Lazarow

== Performance history ==
2007:

- The Investigation of the Murder in El Salvador by Charles L. Mee. Directed by Anthony Darnell and Caitlin Sullivan. (Regional Premiere)
- Never Swim Alone by Daniel McIver. Directed by Andrew Lazarow. (Regional Premiere)
- Hello Again by Michael John LaChiusa. Directed by Andrew Lazarow.
- iLove: created by The Satori Group. Premiered at the 2007 Cincinnati Fringe Festival. iLove: earned the Cincinnati Fringe Festival's Producer’s Pick of the Fringe and was nominated for the Cincinnati Entertainment Award (CEA) for Best Alternative Production. (World Premiere)

2008:

- (rsvp) written by Anthony Darnell. Directed by Andrew Lazarow. Premiered at the 2008 Cincinnati Fringe Festival and received Cincinnati CityBeat's Critic's Pick. (World Premiere)

2009:

- TRAGEDY: a tragedy by Will Eno. Directed by Adam Standley and Caitlin Sullivan. (Regional Premiere)

2009-2010: Choose, Witness, Live

- Artifacts of Consequence by Ashlin Halfnight. Directed by Andrew Lazarow. (Regional Premiere)
- Winky by George Saunders. Adapted with The Satori Group by Spike Friedman. Directed by Caitlin Sullivan. (World Premiere)
- The Making of a Monster at the Northwest New Works Festival at On The Boards. Directed by Adam Standley. (World Premiere) Seattle Times Footlight Award for Avant-garde Afterglow.
- Special Presentation of UNDINE by Hand2Mouth Theatre and New Work in the Pacific Northwest panel discussion hosted by Brendan Kiley (The Stranger).

2011:

- Fabulous Prizes by Neil Ferron. Directed by Caitlin Sullivan. (World Premiere). Nominated for The Gregory Award for Outstanding Playwright.

2014:

- Returning to Albert Joseph by Spike Friedman. Directed by Alex Matthews and Caitlin Sullivan. (World Premiere).

== Awards and honors ==
- 2005 – nominee: CEA for Best Supporting Actor - Anthony Darnell
- 2006 – nominee: CEA for Actor in a Leading Role - Adam Standley
- 2006 – nominee: CEA for Alternative Production (Critical Achievement) - Andrew Lazarow
- 2006 – Acclaim Award for Excellence in Media Design - Andrew Lazarow
- 2007 – nominee: CEA for Best Alternative Production - iLove:
- 2007 – Producer’s Pick of the Cincinnati Fringe - iLove:
- 2007 – Cincinnati Enquirer Acclaim Award (Rising Star) - Anthony Darnell
- 2008 – Theatre Artist Project (TAP) Grant - Anthony Darnell
- 2008 – Cincinnati CityBeat Critic’s Pick - (rsvp)
- 2009 – Seattle Times Footlight Award for Best of Fringe - TRAGEDY: a tragedy
- 2009 – runner-up: Seattle Times Footlight Award for Friskiest Fringe in Seattle
- 2009 – Seattle Office of Arts & Cultural Affairs smART Ventures Award
- 2010 – Seattle Times Footlight Award for Avant-garde Afterglow - Winky
- 2011 – nominee: Gregory Award for Outstanding Playwright - Neil Ferron, Fabulous Prizes
- 2014 – nominee: The Stranger Genius Award Nomination for Performance.
