= List of Marisa Tomei performances =

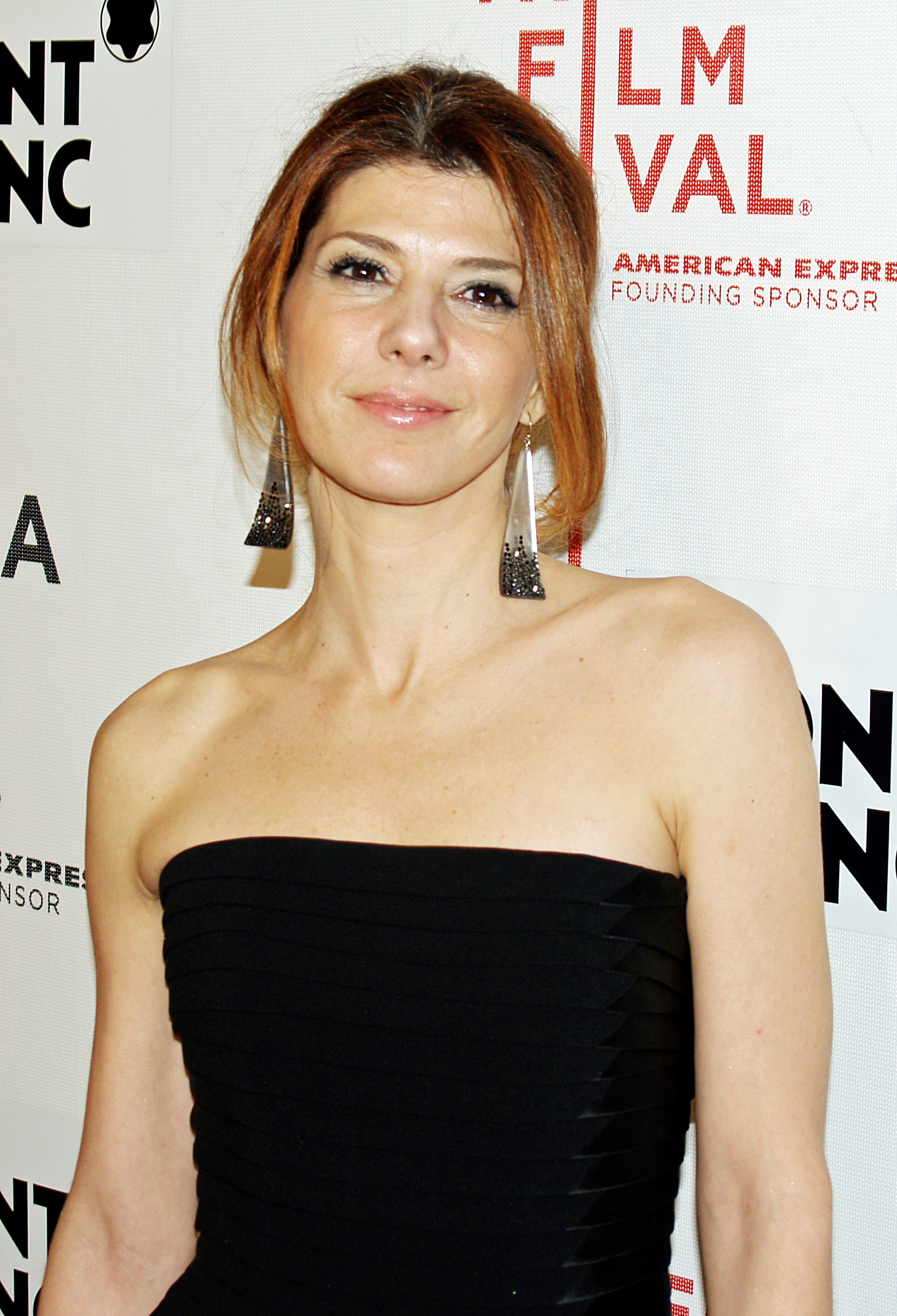
Tomei at the 2008 Tribeca Film Festival

Marisa Tomei is an American actress. Following her work on the television series As the World Turns, she came to prominence as a cast member on The Cosby Show spin-off A Different World in 1987. After having minor roles in a few films, she came to international attention in 1992 with the comedy My Cousin Vinny, for which she received an Academy Award for Best Supporting Actress. She received two additional Academy Award nominations for In the Bedroom (2001) and The Wrestler (2008).

Tomei has appeared in a number of successful movies, including What Women Want (2000), Someone like You (2001), Anger Management (2003), Wild Hogs (2007), and Parental Guidance (2012). Other films include Untamed Heart (1993), Only You (1994), The Paper (1994), Unhook the Stars (1996), Welcome to Sarajevo (1997), Slums of Beverly Hills (1998), Before the Devil Knows You're Dead (2007), Cyrus (2010), Love Is Strange (2014), The Big Short (2015), and The First Purge (2018). She also portrays May Parker in the Marvel Cinematic Universe, having appeared in Captain America: Civil War (2016), Spider-Man: Homecoming (2017), Avengers: Endgame (2019), Spider-Man: Far From Home (2019), Spider-Man: No Way Home (2021), and Spider-Man: Brand New Day (2026). She also portrays Pete Davidson's mom in The King of Staten Island (2020).

Tomei has also worked in theater. She was involved with the Naked Angels Theater Company and appeared in plays, such as Daughters (1986), Wait Until Dark (1998), Top Girls (2008), for which she received a nomination for the Drama Desk Award for Outstanding Featured Actress in a Play, and The Realistic Joneses (2014), for which she received a special award at the Drama Desk Awards.

== Film ==
Key
†	Denotes films that have not yet been released

Year	Title	Role	Notes
1986	Playing for Keeps	Tracy	
1991	Oscar	Lisa Provolone	
1991	Zandalee	Remy	
1992	My Cousin Vinny	Mona Lisa Vito	
1992	Equinox	Rosie Rivers	
1992	Chaplin	Mabel Normand	
1993	Untamed Heart	Caroline	
1994	Only You	Faith Corvatch	
1994	The Paper	Martha Hackett	
1995	The Perez Family	Dorita Evita Perez	
1995	Four Rooms	Margaret	
1996	Unhook the Stars	Monica Warren	
1997	A Brother's Kiss	Missy	
1997	Welcome to Sarajevo	Nina	
1998	Slums of Beverly Hills	Rita Abromowitz	
2000	Happy Accidents	Ruby Weaver	
2000	The Watcher	Dr. Polly Beilman	
2000	What Women Want	Lola	
2000	King of the Jungle	Detective Susan Costello	
2000	Dirk and Betty	Paris	
2001	In the Bedroom	Natalie Strout	
2001	Someone like You	Liz	
2002	The Wild Thornberrys Movie	Bree Blackburn (voice)	
2002	Just a Kiss	Paula	
2002	The Guru	Lexi	
2003	Anger Management	Linda	
2004	Alfie	Julie	
2005	Loverboy	Sybil Stoll	
2005	Marilyn Hotchkiss' Ballroom Dancing and Charm School	Meredith Morrison	
2005	Factotum	Laura	
2006	Danika	Danika Merrick	
2007	Grace Is Gone	Woman at Pool	
2007	Wild Hogs	Maggie	
2007	Before the Devil Knows You're Dead	Gina Hanson	
2008	War, Inc.	Natalie Hegalhuzen	
2008	The Wrestler	Cassidy / Pam	
2010	Cyrus	Molly Fawcett	
2011	The Lincoln Lawyer	Maggie McPherson	
2011	Salvation Boulevard	Honey Foster	
2011	Crazy, Stupid, Love	Kate Tafferty	
2011	The Ides of March	Ida Horowicz	
2012	Inescapable	Fatima	
2012	Parental Guidance	Alice Simmons	
2014	Love Is Strange	Kate Hull	
2014	The Rewrite	Holly Carpenter	
2014	Loitering with Intent	Gigi	
2015	Spare Parts	Gwen Kolinsky	
2015	Trainwreck	The Dog Owner	
2015	Love the Coopers	Emma	
2015	The Big Short	Cynthia Baum	
2016	Captain America: Civil War	May Parker	
2017	Spider-Man: Homecoming	May Parker	
2017	Laboratory Conditions	Dr. Emma Holloway	Short
2018	After Everything	Dr. Lisa Harden	
2018	The First Purge	Dr. May Updale	
2018	Dark Was the Night	Margaret Lang	
2019	Avengers: Endgame	May Parker	Cameo
2019	Frankie	Irene	
2019	Spider-Man: Far From Home	May Parker	
2019	Human Capital	Carrie	
2019	I Hate Kids	Christina Hurley	
2020	The King of Staten Island	Margie Carlin	
2021	Spider-Man: No Way Home	May Parker	
2022	Delia's Gone	Francine "Fran" Cole	
2023	She Came to Me	Katrina Trento	
2024	Upgraded	Claire DuPont	
2024	High Tide	Miriam	Also executive producer
2024	Brothers	Bethesda Waingro	
2025	You're Dating a Narcissist!	Judy Kaplan	
2026	F*ck Valentine's Day	Wendy	
2026	Spider-Man: Brand New Day	May Parker	
2026	The Mongoose	Tara	
TBA	She Gets It from Me †	Charlotte	Post-production

== Television ==
Year	Title	Role	Notes
1983–1985	As the World Turns	Marcy Thompson	Series regular
1987	ABC Afterschool Special	Noelle Crandall	Episode: "Supermom's Daughter"
1987	Leg Work	Donna Ricci	Episode: "Pilot"
1987	A Different World	Maggie Lauten	22 episodes
1990	Parker Krane	April Haynes	Television movie
1994	Saturday Night Live	Host	Episode: "Marisa Tomei/Bonnie Raitt"
1996	Seinfeld	Herself	Episode: "The Cadillac"
1998	Since You've Been Gone	Tori	Uncredited
1998	My Own Country	Mattie Vines	Television movie
1998	Only Love	Evie Webster Josephson	Television movie
1999	Franklin	Dynaroo (voice)	Episode: "Franklin Plants a Tree/Franklin the Hero"
2001	Jenifer	Nina Capelli	Television movie
2003	The Simpsons	Sara Sloane (voice)	Episode: "A Star Is Born Again"
2006	Rescue Me	Angie Gavin	4 episodes
2007	The Rich Inner Life of Penelope Cloud	Penelope Cloud	Television movie
2012	Comedy Bang! Bang!	Herself	Episode: "Ed Helms Wears A Grey Shirt & Brown Boots"
2015	Empire	Mimi Whiteman	5 episodes
2018	The Handmaid's Tale	Mrs. O'Conner	Episode: "Unwomen"
2019	Live in Front of a Studio Audience	Edith Bunker	2 television specials
2020	Sarah Cooper: Everything's Fine	Satan	Television special
2027	War	Avery Reed	Main role, Series 2

== Stage ==
Year	Title	Role	Venue	Ref.
1986	Daughters	Cetta	Off-Broadway	
1987	Beirut	Blue	Robert W. Wilson MMC Theater, Off-Broadway	
1988	Sharon and Billy	Sharon	MCC Theater, Off-Broadway	
1989	What the Butler Saw	Geraldine Barclay	Manhattan Theatre Club, Off-Broadway	
1989	The Rose Tattoo	Rosa Delle Rose	Williamstown Theatre Festival	
1992	The Comedy of Errors	Adriana	Delacorte Theater, Broadway	
1994	Slavs!	Katherine Serafima Gleb	New York Theatre Workshop, Off-Broadway	
1996	Dark Rapture	Julie	Second Stage Theater, Off-Broadway	
1996	Rocket to the Moon	Cleo Singer	Williamstown Theatre Festival	
1996	Demonology	Gina	Playwrights Horizons, Off-Broadway	
1997	Waiting for Lefty	Edna / Secretary	Blue Light Theater Company at Classic Stage Company, Off-Broadway	
1998	Wait Until Dark	Susy Hendrix	Wilbur Theatre	
1998	Wait Until Dark	Susy Hendrix	Brooks Atkinson Theatre, Broadway	
1999	We Won't Pay, We Won't Pay	Antonia	American Repertory Theater	
2003	Salomé	Salome	Ethel Barrymore Theatre, Broadway	
2004	Design for Living	Gilda	Williamstown Theatre Festival	
2007	Oh the Humanity and Other Good Intentions	performer	The Flea Theater, Off-Broadway	
2008	Top Girls	Isabella Bird / Joyce / Mrs. Kidd	Biltmore Theatre, Broadway	
2011	Marie and Bruce	Marie	The New Group, Off-Broadway	
2014	The Realistic Joneses	Pony Jones	Lyceum Theatre, Broadway	
2016	The Rose Tattoo	Serafina Delle Rose	Williamstown Theatre Festival	
2017	How to Transcend a Happy Marriage	George	Mitzi E. Newhouse Theater, Off-Broadway	
2019	The Rose Tattoo	Serafina Delle Rose	American Airlines Theatre, Broadway	
2024	Babe	Abby	Alice Griffin Jewel Box Theatre, Off-Broadway	
