= Jake and the Fatman =

American crime drama television series

- Title screen
- Genre: Crime drama Legal drama
- Created by: Dean Hargrove; Joel Steiger; Ann Doherty
- Developed by: Douglas Stefen Borghi
- Starring: William Conrad; Joe Penny; Alan Campbell
- Country of origin: United States
- Original language: English
- No. of seasons: 5
- No. of episodes: 106 (list of episodes)

Production
- Executive producers: Dean Hargrove; Fred Silverman; Joel Steiger
- Production locations: Los Angeles, California; Oahu, Hawaii
- Running time: approx. 45 minutes
- Production companies: The Fred Silverman Company; Strathmore Productions (1987–1988); Dean Hargrove Productions (1988–1992); Viacom Productions

Original release
- Network: CBS
- Release: September 26, 1987 – May 6, 1992

Related
- Matlock; Diagnosis: Murder

Jake and the Fatman is an American crime drama legal drama television series starring William Conrad as prosecutor J. L. (Jason Lochinvar) "Fatman" McCabe and Joe Penny as investigator Jake Styles. Created by Dean Hargrove and Joel Steiger, the series ran on CBS for five seasons from September 26, 1987, to May 6, 1992.

Diagnosis: Murder, which aired from 1993 to 2001, was a medical-oriented spin-off of Jake and the Fatman that came to be a popular series of its own.

== Plot ==
J. L. "Fatman" McCabe is a Hawaii-born, tough former Honolulu Police Department officer turned Los Angeles district attorney. He is teamed with a handsome, happy-go-lucky special investigator named Jake Styles. They often clash due to their different styles and personalities. "Fatman" travels hardly anywhere without Max, his pet bulldog. The show was set in Los Angeles during the first season. After the end of Magnum, P.I., the show was moved to Hawaii. The second and third seasons and half of the fourth season were filmed in Honolulu and some of the production sets from Magnum, P.I. were used. The show then returned to Los Angeles for the remainder of its run.

== Cast ==
=== Main cast ===
- William Conrad as District Attorney J. L. "Fatman" McCabe
- Joe Penny as Detective Jake Styles
- Alan Campbell as Assistant District Attorney Derek Mitchell

=== Recurring guest stars ===
- Lu Leonard as Gertrude
- Karen Keawehawaii as Audrey Durant
- Olga Russell as Lisbeth Berkeley-Smythe
- Jack Hogan as Judge Smithwood
- Melody Anderson as Sergeant Neely Capshaw

Guest stars on the series included Alex Cord, Robert Culp, Scott Marlowe, Ed Nelson, Robert Reed, Mitch Ryan, Ray Sharkey, and David Soul.

== Production ==
=== Development ===
Conrad guest starred as an aging prosecutor in a two-part episode of Matlock during its first season on NBC. Executive producers Fred Silverman and Dean Hargrove decided to use this character as a model for one of the main characters in a new show they were creating for CBS. Penny also guest starred in these episodes, but his character was not on the same side as Conrad's character in the storyline's legal case.

Following the departure of Hargrove, executive producers David Moessinger and Jeri Taylor were brought on to run the series with Silverman. They also hired J. Michael Straczynski as an executive story consultant. Taylor and Moessinger ran the show for two years before finally leaving in a dispute over control over the show.

Straczynski has written that he was hired after pitching a story that let Conrad sit down for almost every scene, noting his own faux slogan for the show "Jake and the Fatman: He can't act, he can't walk, together they fight crime".

=== Rumors ===
Joe Penny lost a large amount of weight after the show moved to Hawaii, which led to many rumors about his health, including the possibility that he had AIDS. In actuality, he had suffered from a gastrointestinal virus and was having difficulty regaining the weight he lost. When the show moved back to Los Angeles, it was suspected that it was on Penny's urging, which Penny denied.

== Episodes ==
Season	Episodes	Originally released		
Season	Episodes	First released	Last released	Network
Pilot	2	October 28, 1986	November 4, 1986	NBC
1	23	September 26, 1987	April 6, 1988	CBS
2	11	March 15, 1989	May 24, 1989	CBS
3	26	September 20, 1989	May 16, 1990	CBS
4	24	September 12, 1990	May 8, 1991	CBS
5	22	September 18, 1991	May 6, 1992	CBS

== Home media ==
CBS DVD (distributed by Paramount) released the first two seasons of Jake and the Fatman on DVD in Region 1 between 2008/2009. As of June 2015, these releases have been discontinued and are out of print.

Visual Entertainment released Jake and the Fatman - The Complete Collection on June 23, 2017.

DVD name	Ep #	Region 1
Season One, Volume One	11	July 8, 2008
Season One, Volume Two	12	December 2, 2008
Season Two	11	May 5, 2009
Season Three	26	N/A
Season Four	24	N/A
Season Five	22	N/A
The Complete Series	106	June 23, 2017

== Spin-off ==
The nineteenth episode of the fourth season of Jake and the Fatman, "It Never Entered My Mind", featured Dick Van Dyke as Dr. Mark Sloan, a medical doctor who solves crimes. The success of that episode led initially to a series of three TV movies, and then a weekly television series Diagnosis: Murder that debuted on CBS on October 29, 1993.
