= Tejas (album) =

Studio album by ZZ Top
- Released: November 29, 1976
- Recorded: 1976
- Genres: Southern rock; blues rock; boogie rock
- Length: 34:38
- Label: London
- Producer: Bill Ham

ZZ Top chronology
Fandango! (1975)	Tejas (1976)	The Best of ZZ Top (1977)

Singles from Tejas
- 1. "It's Only Love" Released: 1976; 2. "Arrested for Driving While Blind" Released: 1977; 3. "Enjoy and Get It On" Released: 1977

Tejas is the fifth album by the American rock band ZZ Top. It was released in November 1976, on the London label.

== Background and release ==
Arrested for Driving While Blind
audio clip (original vinyl 1976 mix)

Frontman Billy Gibbons said about the album:

It's fair to say that this is a transitional record, although I'm not really sure what we were transitioning from and what we were becoming. (laughs) It may be representative of how rapidly things were changing in the studio.

The equipment was becoming more modernized, and the way that music was being recorded was different – things were moving faster. It was still pre-digital, but there was better gear that was more readily available. We made use of it all.

This period was the wrinkle that kind of suggested what was to come, and change would become a necessary part of the ZZ Top fabric.

Tejas was produced by Bill Ham and recorded and mixed by Terry Manning. In 1987, a digitally remixed version of the recording was released on CD and the original 1976 mix version was discontinued. The remix version (which was not remixed by original engineer Manning) created controversy among fans because it significantly changed the instrument balance and the sound of the instruments, especially the drums.

Tejas was released as a digital download on Amazon.com's MP3 store and iTunes in 2012, with the original mixes of the tracks that are included on Chrome, Smoke & BBQ, and the 1987 remixes of the tracks that are not from that boxset. The original mix of the album was released on CD in June 2013 as part of the box set The Complete Studio Albums (1970–1990).

== Critical reception ==
Professional ratings
Review scores
Source	Rating
AllMusic	2/5 stars
Christgau's Record Guide	C+
Rolling Stone	(not rated)
The Rolling Stone Album Guide	2.5/5 stars

In a contemporaneous review of the album Richard Riegel of Creem called Tejas an album that "sings of those Southwestern lyrical staples... but with greater immediacy than the I'm-all-dressed-up-in-my-Roy-Rogers-cowboy-suit Eagles". He compared the album to that of Peter Frampton's Frampton Comes Alive!, but observes that Tejas might outsell Frampton.

Barry Cain of Record Mirror wrote in a review that Tejas was highlighted by the songs "Arrested For Driving While Blind" and "El Diablo". He states that "El Diablo" had "struck him as being about the most haunting song he ever come across". Cain also praised the vocals and guitar playing of Billy Gibbons on the album.

Writing for the Something Else! webzine in 2016, M. C. Mosquito said, "There are actually a lot of very good songs on Tejas, but many critics and much of the public dismissed it as ZZ Top gone "countrified," in part because of the twangy opener "It's Only Love." ... The rest of the record, however, is only a little more country than the rest of the band's initial albums. Had that song been shuffled down elsewhere in the sequence and replaced with something like "Ten Dollar Man" as the lead off track, maybe the twang tone factor wouldn't have been so noticeable, making it more marketable to the rock 'n' roll crowd. Then again, there's some pretty countrified fiddle in there too, so maybe the country label is kind of legit."

== Track listing ==
All lead vocals are by Billy Gibbons, except where noted.

All tracks are written by Gibbons, Dusty Hill, and Frank Beard, except where noted.

Side one
No.	Title	Lead vocals	Length
1.	"It's Only Love"	Gibbons; Hill	4:24
2.	"Arrested for Driving While Blind"		3:05
3.	"El Diablo"		4:20
4.	"Snappy Kakkie"		2:56
5.	"Enjoy and Get It On"		3:23

Side two
No.	Title	Lead vocals	Length
1.	"Ten Dollar Man"	Hill	3:42
2.	"Pan Am Highway Blues"	Gibbons; Hill	3:15
3.	"Avalon Hideaway"	Gibbons; Hill	3:07
4.	"She's a Heartbreaker"		3:02
5.	"Asleep in the Desert" (instrumental)		3:24

== Personnel ==
ZZ Top

- Billy Gibbons – guitar, vocals, harmonica
- Dusty Hill – bass, lead vocals on "Ten Dollar Man", co-lead vocals on "It's Only Love", "Snappy Kakkie", "Avalon Hideaway", and on "She's a Heartbreaker"
- Frank Beard – drums, percussion

Additional musician

- Lenny Solomon – violin on "She's a Heartbreaker"

Production

- Producer – Bill Ham
- Engineer – Terry Manning
- Mastering – Larry Nix
- Photography – Lee and Lesser
- Album concept – Bill Ham
- Album design – Bill Narum

== Charts ==
Weekly chart performance for Tejas
Chart (1976–1977)	Peak position
Australian Albums (Kent Music Report)	72
Canada Top Albums/CDs (RPM)	3
Japanese Albums (Oricon)	42
Swedish Albums (Sverigetopplistan)	21
US Billboard 200	17

== Certifications ==
Certifications for Tejas
Region	Certification	Certified units/sales
United States (RIAA)	Gold	500,000^{^}
^{^} Shipments figures based on certification alone.
