= My Only Love (disambiguation) =

My Only Love is a Philippine television drama series first aired 2007–08.

My Only Love may also refer to:

- My Only Love (film), the English title of Hobbi al-Wahid, a 1960 Egyptian drama/romance film
- "My Only Love", a song by Roxy Music on the 1980 album Flesh and Blood
- "My Only Love", a song by Moby on the 2020 album All Visible Objects
- "My Only Love" (song), a song written by Jimmy Fortune and recorded in 1984 by The Statler Brothers
- "My Only Love", a song by Bob Sinclar on the 1998 album Paradise

== See also ==
- Only Love (disambiguation)
