= Will Eno =

American playwright

Will Eno (born 1965) is an American playwright based in Brooklyn, New York. His play, Thom Pain (based on nothing) was a finalist for the Pulitzer Prize in Drama in 2005. His play The Realistic Joneses appeared on Broadway in 2014, where it received a Drama Desk Special Award and was named Best Play on Broadway by USA Today, and best American play of 2014 by The Guardian. His play The Open House was presented Off-Broadway at the Signature Theatre in 2014 and won the Obie Award for Playwriting as well as other awards, and was on both TIME Magazine and Time Out New York 's Top Ten Plays of 2014.

== Biography ==
Eno grew up in Billerica, Carlisle, and Westford, Massachusetts and attended Concord-Carlisle High School. He was a competitive cyclist from the age of about 13 until his early 20s.

For three years he attended the University of Massachusetts, Amherst, but dropped out and moved to New York. He is married to actress Maria Dizzia.

== Career ==
His plays have been produced in New York City, Off-Broadway and by regional and European theatres: the Gate Theatre, the SOHO Theatre, and BBC Radio (London); the Rude Mechanicals Theater Company, The Satori Group (Seattle); the Flea Theater, NY Power Company and Naked Angels (New York City); Quebracho Théâtre - Monica Espina (Paris); Circle-X (Los Angeles); The Cutting Ball Theater(San Francisco). Thom Pain has been produced in Brazil, Italy, Germany, France, Norway, Denmark, Israel, Mexico and other countries.

His plays are published by Oberon Books, TCG, playscripts, and have appeared in Harper's, Antioch Review, The Quarterly, and Best Ten-Minute Plays for Two Actors.

=== Works ===
The Flu Season was produced by The Rude Mechanicals Theater Company at the Blue Heron Arts Center, New York City, from January 29, 2004, to February 22, 2004. The play won the 2004 Oppenheimer Award, presented by New York Newsday, for best debut production in the previous year in New York by an American playwright.

Although some his plays were originally mainly produced in Britain, Eno has been making headway in New York City theatre ever since the 2004 debut of Thom Pain (based on nothing). Charles Isherwood, theatre critic for The New York Times, called Eno "a Samuel Beckett for the Jon Stewart generation". Thom Pain (based on nothing) was a finalist for the 2005 Pulitzer Prize for Drama.

Oh, the Humanity and Other Exclamations (formerly Oh, the Humanity and other good intentions), which consists of 5 short plays, premiered Off-Broadway at The Flea Theatre from November to December 2007. His play Tragedy: a tragedy had its American premiere at Berkeley Repertory Theatre, California, in March and April 2008. The play has also been produced by The Satori Group, a Cincinnati-based theatre group, in Seattle in 2009, and is usually mentioned along with another of his plays titled, King: A Problem Play.

Middletown opened Off-Broadway at the Vineyard Theatre in November 2010 through December 5, 2010, and Eno won the 2010 Horton Foote Prize for Promising New American Play. Middletown was produced by the Steppenwolf Theatre Company in 2011, Dobama Theatre of Cleveland Heights, Ohio, Third Rail Repertory Theatre in Portland, Oregon, and Actors' Shakespeare Project of Boston, Massachusetts in February 2013.

Title and Deed (a collaboration with the Gare St. Lazare Players of Ireland) made its American premiere Off-Broadway at the Signature Theatre Company from March 2012 to June 2012. The play premiered in Ireland in 2011. His adaptation of Ibsen's Peer Gynt titled Gnit had its world premiere at the 37th Humana Festival of New American Plays in March 2013.

In his Broadway debut, The Realistic Joneses began previews at the Lyceum Theatre on March 13, 2014, and officially opened on April 6, 2014, after a run at the Yale Repertory Theater in 2012. The play is directed by Sam Gold with a cast that stars Michael C. Hall, Toni Collette, Marisa Tomei and Tracy Letts. The New York Times reviewer of the Broadway production wrote: "But don't come to the play expecting tidy resolutions, clearly drawn narrative arcs or familiarly typed characters. 'The Realistic Joneses' progresses in a series of short scenes that have the shape and rhythms of sketches on Saturday Night Live rather than those of a traditional play. (Most are followed by quick blackouts.) And while the Joneses—all four of them—have all the aspects of normal folks, as their names would suggest, they also possess an uncanny otherness expressed through their stylized, disordered way of communicating. ... But for all Mr. Eno’s quirks, his words cut to the heart of how we muddle through the worst life can bring." The regional premiere was performed at Dobama Theatre of Cleveland Heights, Ohio, featuring Joel Hammer, Tracee Patterson, Rachel Zake, and Chris Richards.

In 2014 his play The Open House received its world premiere Off-Broadway at The Pershing Square Signature Center (Signature Theatre), running from February 11, 2014 (previews), officially on March 3 through March 23, 2014. The cast featured Hannah Bos, Michael Countryman, Peter Friedman, Danny McCarthy and Carolyn McCormick with direction by Oliver Butler. The play won the 2014 Drama Desk Award Special Award Ensemble; the 2014 Lucille Lortel Award, Outstanding Play; and 2014 OBIE Awards, Playwriting and Direction.

His play Wakey, Wakey opened Off-Broadway at the Signature Theatre on February 7, 2017, in previews. Directed by Eno, the two-person cast stars January LaVoy and Michael Emerson. The play officially opened on February 27 and ran to March 26, 2017.

His audio play Life is a Radio in Dark was written specifically for actor Toby Jones and was broadcast on BBC Radio 3 in June 2023. The production has a binaural soundtrack.

== Literary background ==
On 5 April 2014, The Economist magazine commented on the comparison of Eno to Samuel Beckett stating: "(Eno) is also quick to acknowledge Beckett's influence, less for the writer's formal inventiveness than for his 'simple human stuff'. For example, he cites the line in 'Endgame' when Hamm declares, 'Get out of here and love one another.'" In response to a query by the critic Jonathan Kalb, he wrote in 2006 that "It would be good for the theatre and for the world at large if there were more signs of [Beckett's] influence--his humaneness, invention, and humility."

== Awards and honors ==
Will Eno won a Henry Award in 2006 for Outstanding New Play for The War Anthology with Tony Kushner, Melissa Lucero McCarl, Bonnie Metzgar, Suzan-Lori Parks, Elaine Romero, Mildred Ruiz, Robert Lewis Vaughan and Paula Vogel.

He is a Helen Merrill Playwriting Fellow, a recipient of the Guggenheim Fellowship, and an Edward F. Albee Foundation Fellow. In 2004, he was awarded the first Marian Seldes/Garson Kanin Fellowship by the Theater Hall of Fame.

Eno received the 2012 PEN/Laura Pels International Foundation for Theater Award.

He has received a resident playwrights award in the Residency Five program from the Signature Theatre Company, beginning in spring 2012. The participants are guaranteed three full world-premiere productions over a five-year residency.

Eno received the 2014 Obie Award for Playwriting for The Open House. The Open House also won the 2014 Lucille Lortel Award for Outstanding Play.

Eno and the ensembles of The Open House and The Realistic Joneses received a 2014 Drama Desk Award Special Award, "For two extraordinary casts and one impressively inventive playwright."
