= Hello Again (musical) =

Musical by Michael John LaChiusa

- Original off-Broadway poster
- Music: Michael John LaChiusa
- Lyrics: Michael John LaChiusa
- Book: Michael John LaChiusa
- Basis: La Ronde by Arthur Schnitzler
- Productions: 1994 Off-Broadway; 2001 West End; 2011 Off-Broadway; 2019 Off-West End; 2022 Amsterdam

Hello Again is a musical with music, lyrics and book by Michael John LaChiusa. It is based on the 1897 play La Ronde by Arthur Schnitzler (also titled Reigen). It focuses on a series of love affairs among ten characters during the ten different decades of the 20th century.

The musical premiered Off-Broadway in 1993, directed and choreographed by Graciela Daniele. Since then it has been performed in London, Sweden, Australia, Germany, The Netherlands and New York.

== Adaptation and plot ==
LaChiusa's musical adaptation follows the structure of Schnitzler's original material closely, often replicating fragments of his dialogue, detailing a daisy chain of sexual encounters and love affairs among ten characters in ten scenes. His innovation, however, was to set each scene of the musical in a different decade of the 20th century and in a non-chronological order, allowing for a huge variety of musical style and pastische ranging from opera to 1970s disco while simultaneously introducing musical and lyrical echoes throughout to tie all the characters and their experiences together. He also altered the gender of Schnitzler's "Little Miss" to the sexually ambiguous "Young Thing" to introduce a homosexual element into his century of sexual congress.

Highlights of the score include "I Got A Little Time", "Tom", "Safe", "The One I Love", "Mistress of the Senator" and "The Bed Was Not My Own".

== Production history ==
The musical premiered Off-Broadway at the Mitzi E. Newhouse Theater (at Lincoln Center) on December 30, 1993 in previews and closed on March 27, 1994, after 101 performances. Directed and musically staged by Graciela Daniele, the show was much in the vein of Stephen Sondheim's Sunday in the Park with George in that the staging was like a classic painting coming to life. It received eight Drama Desk Award nominations including Best Musical, three for LaChiusa (Outstanding Book of a Musical, Music and Lyrics categories), two for Daniele (Choreographer and Director categories) and nominations for actors Judy Blazer, John Cameron Mitchell and Donna Murphy. The original cast album was released in 1994 by RCA Victor.

The musical received its professional European premiere in 2001 at London's Bridewell Theatre, as part of a series of musicals introducing the works of the next generation of major American musical theatre writers. It was directed by the theatre's co-Artistic Director Clive Paget with musical direction by Christopher Frost with a cast that featured Jenna Russell, Matt Rawle, Charles Shirvell and Nigel Richards. There were minor changes made to the score in this production as well as a substantial rewrite to "Scene 8" (The Writer and the Actress) overseen by the composer.

In 2007, the musical received a controversial showing by The Satori Group at The Hustler Sound Stage, a building in Cincinnati that was once the headquarters for Hustler magazine, when publisher Larry Flynt was a local celebrity during the 1970s.

Also in 2007, "Hello Again" premiered in Germany, at the Akademietheater im Prinzregententheater Munich. The production was directed by Silvia Armbruster with musical direction by Philip Tillotson, and the text was translated by Roman Hinze.

In May 2008, it was given its Scandinavian premiere in Gothenburg and Borås in Sweden in a production directed by Vernon Mound with musical direction by Derek Barnes and choreography by Cynthia Kai. The production used the revisions made for the London version and the text was translated by Fredrik Fischer and Linnea Sjunnesson together with members of the cast.

The Transport Group presented the first New York City revival, opening on March 19, 2011 through April 3. This production features new orchestrations by Mary-Mitchell Campbell and was staged non-traditionally in a raw space in SoHo by Jack Cummings III.

"Hello Again" was revived at the Union Theatre, London, opening in September 2019. This new production was directed by Paul Callen, musical direction and orchestrations by Henry Brennan, choreography by Genevieve Leeney, costume design by Reuben Speed, lighting design by Ben Bull, production photography by Mark Senior, casting by Adam Braham, and produced by Sasha Regan with associate producer, Maison Kelley.

== Cast lists ==
1993 Original off-Broadway cast

- The Whore - Donna Murphy
- The Soldier - David A. White
- The Nurse - Judy Blazer
- The College Boy - Michael Park
- The Young Wife - Carolee Carmello
- The Husband - Dennis Parlato
- The Young Thing - John Cameron Mitchell
- The Writer - Malcolm Gets
- The Actress - Michele Pawk
- The Senator - John Dossett

2001 London cast

- The Whore - Ellen O'Grady
- The Soldier - Matt Rawle
- The Nurse - Golda Rosheuvel
- The College Boy - Mark Stobbard
- The Young Wife - Jenna Russell
- The Husband - Charles Shirvell
- The Young Thing - Dominic Brewer
- The Writer - Michael Cahill
- The Actress - Anita Louise Combe
- The Senator - Nigel Richards

2006 Australian Cast

- The Whore - Sophie Carter
- The Soldier - Paul Biencourt
- The Nurse - Jodie Harris
- The College Boy - Chris Purcell
- The Young Wife - Monique Pitsikas
- The Husband - Barry Mitchell
- The Young Thing - Leon Bryant
- The Writer - Matt Heyward
- The Actress- Taneel Van Zyl
- The Senator - David Spencer

2008 Scandinavian cast

- The Whore - Lena Näslund
- The Soldier - Jonas Schlyter
- The Nurse - Hilde Traetteberg
- The College Boy - Mikael Lundin
- The Young Wife - Mari Haugen Smistad
- The Husband - Tore Norrby
- The Young Thing - David Inghamn
- The Writer - Johan Ringström
- The Actress - Maria Camilla Karlsson Stavland
- The Senator - Lennart Eriksson

2008 Australian Cast

- The Whore- Lisa Callingham
- The Soldier- Vincent Hooper
- The Nurse- Liz Stiles
- The College Boy- Keane Fletcher
- The Young Wife- Katrina Retallick
- The Husband- Matt Young
- The Young Thing- Gareth Keegan
- The Writer- Zack Curran
- The Actress- Sigrid Langford-Scherf
- The Senator- Nathan Carter

2011 off-Broadway Revival Cast

- The Whore - Nikka Graff Lanzarone
- The Soldier - Max von Essen
- The Nurse - Elizabeth Stanley
- The College Boy - Robert Lenzi
- The Young Wife - Alexandra Silber
- The Husband - Bob Stillman
- The Young Thing - Blake Daniel
- The Writer - Jonathan Hammond
- The Actress - Rachel Bay Jones
- The Senator - Alan Campbell

2017 Film

- The Whore - Sam Underwood
- The Soldier - Nolan Gerard Funk
- The Nurse - Jenna Ushkowitz
- The College Boy - Al Calderon
- The Young Wife - Rumer Willis
- The Husband - T. R. Knight
- The Young Thing - Tyler Blackburn
- The Writer - Cheyenne Jackson
- The Actress - Audra McDonald
- The Senator - Martha Plimpton

2019 Off-West End/London Revival Cast

- The Whore - Ellen O'Grady
- The Soldier - Jack Rowell
- The Nurse - Alice Ellen Wright
- The College Boy - Regan Burke
- The Young Wife - Grace Roberts
- The Husband - Keith Merrill
- The Young Thing - Phillip Murch
- The Writer - George Whitty
- The Actress - Amy Parker
- The Senator - David Pendlebury

== Scenes and musical numbers ==
- The Whore and the Soldier - Hello Again
- The Soldier and the Nurse - Zei Gezent / I Gotta Little Time / We Kiss
- The Nurse and the College Boy - In Some Other Life
- The College Boy and the Young Wife - Story of My Life
- The Young Wife and the Husband - At the Prom / Ah Maien Zeit / Tom
- The Husband and the Young Thing - Listen to the Music
- The Young Thing and the Writer - Montage / Safe / The One I Love
- The Writer and the Actress - Silent Movie
- The Actress and the Senator - Rock With Rock / Angel of Mercy / Mistress of the Senator
- The Senator and the Whore - The Bed Was Not My Own / Hello Again (Reprise)

== Film ==
The stage musical has been adapted to film, which is directed by Tom Gustafson and written by Cory Krueckeberg. Filming began in December 2015 and had a limited release in the United States on November 8, 2017.
