= The Realistic Joneses =

Play by Will Eno

- Original language: English
- Written by: Will Eno
- Characters: Bob Jones, Jennifer Jones, John Jones, Pony Jones

Premiere
- Date: 2012
- Place: Yale Repertory Theater, New Haven, Connecticut

The Realistic Joneses is a play by Will Eno. It opened on Broadway in 2014 after premiering in 2012 at the Yale Repertory Theater.

== Production history ==
The Realistic Joneses premiered at the Yale Repertory Theater, New Haven, Connecticut in April – May 2012, and starred Johanna Day, Glenn Fitzgerald, Tracy Letts, and Parker Posey, with direction by Sam Gold. The play was commissioned by Yale Repertory Theater.

The play began previews on Broadway at the Lyceum Theatre on March 13, 2014 and officially opened on April 6, 2014. The play starred Tracy Letts as Bob Jones, Toni Collette as his wife, Jennifer, Michael C. Hall as John Jones and Marisa Tomei as his wife, Pony. The play was directed by Sam Gold, with Scenic Design by David Zinn, costumes by Kaye Voyce, lighting by Mark Barton, and sound by Leon Rothenberg. The play closed on July 6, 2014 after 105 performances.

The play ran at the Geary Theater, San Francisco, California, in an A.C.T. production, in March and April 2016.

== Overview ==
Bob Jones and his wife Jennifer meet their new next-door neighbors, John and Pony Jones. They discuss their lives, giving an "inside look at the people who live next door, the truths we think we know and the secrets we never imagined we all might share." Eno said that he wrote The Realistic Joneses because he " 'wanted to really just write a naturalistic and realistic play.' Not that 'Realistic Joneses' is precisely realistic. Both plays ['Open House'] read like sitcoms broadcast from a weirder, more melancholy world."

== Critical reception ==
The reviewer of the Yale Repertory production wrote: "The wizardry of Eno's craft, directed with just the right tone by Sam Gold (with deft help by Mark Barton's striking light design), is that, as surrealistic as this world may seem, and as awkwardly funny as the action is, theatergoers most certainly identify with these characters' loneliness."

The USA Today reviewer (of the Broadway production) wrote: "Mortality itself is a key concern, and not just in relation to illness.... Joneses isn't a downer, though, and director Sam Gold and his excellent cast ensure that its humor and poignance are equally served. Predictably, there's no neat resolution; the play ends with all four of its characters in a relatively upbeat mood, yet not any surer how things will turn out."

Charles Isherwood of The New York Times wrote: "But don’t come to the play expecting tidy resolutions, clearly drawn narrative arcs or familiarly typed characters. 'The Realistic Joneses' progresses in a series of short scenes that have the shape and rhythms of sketches on 'Saturday Night Live' rather than those of a traditional play.... But for all Mr. Eno’s quirks, his words cut to the heart of how we muddle through the worst life can bring."

== Awards and nominations ==
The Realistic Joneses was nominated for three 2014 Drama League Awards, for Outstanding Production Of A Broadway Or Off-Broadway Play, and Distinguished Performance Award (Michael C. Hall and Tracy Letts). In addition, the production was recognized twice for the 2014 Drama Desk Special Awards. The special awards are voted by the Drama Desk "to recognize excellence and significant contributions to the theatre." Will Eno along with the cast of The Realistic Joneses were recognized.
