= Alan Campbell (actor) =

American actor (born 1957)

- Born: Bruce Alan Campbell; April 22, 1957 (age 69); Homestead, Florida, U.S.
- Occupation: Actor
- Years active: 1979–present
- Spouses: Lauren Kennedy (m. 1999; div. 2013); Nova Ball (m. 1987; div. 1990)
- Children: 1 (Riley Rose Campbell)

Bruce Alan Campbell (born April 22, 1957) is an American actor. He is best known for his roles as Derek Mitchell in the 1987–1992 CBS series Jake and the Fatman and as E.Z. Taylor on the short-lived 1984–1985 Three's Company spin-off Three's a Crowd.

== Early life and education ==
Bruce Alan Campbell was born on April 22, 1957, in Homestead, Florida, the son of Edward John Campbell, a farmer, and Audrey Carolyn Griner (1930–2015), a homemaker. Campbell attended Tulane University and graduated with a BA in business from the University of Miami.

== Career ==
On television, Campbell became known to viewers when he co-starred with John Ritter on the short-lived Three's Company spin-off Three's a Crowd (1984–1985) in which he played the comedic role of E.Z. Taylor, Jack Tripper's "surfer dude" assistant chef at his bistro. He also co-starred for five seasons with William Conrad and Joe Penny as Assistant District Attorney Derek Mitchell on the CBS crime drama Jake and the Fatman (1987–1992). Campbell has guest starred on numerous television shows including The Facts of Life, Matlock, All My Children, Law & Order, Law & Order: SVU, Homicide: Life on the Street, as well as the web series, Submissions Only and Then We Got Help!.

Campbell was also an established stage actor having appeared on Broadway, Off-Broadway and regional theater. In 1994, he made his Broadway debut in the New York premiere of Andrew Lloyd Webber's musical Sunset Boulevard starring opposite Glenn Close and Alice Ripley, and received a Best Actor in a Musical Tony Award nomination for his performance as Joe Gillis, a role he reprised from the musical's 1993 US premiere in Los Angeles starring opposite Close, again, and Judy Kuhn. He also starred in Susan Stroman's 2000 Tony Award-winning musical Contact at the Vivian Beaumont Theater, Lincoln Center, and its final performance was broadcast by PBS as part of its Live from Lincoln Center series on September 1, 2002. His most current Broadway role was playing Sam Carmichael in the hit musical Mamma Mia! from 2014 until production ceased in September 2015.

His Off-Broadway credits include Adrift In Macao, Book of Days, Avow and Hello Again. He has appeared in several regional theatrical productions of Race, Death and the Maiden, 12 Angry Men, Hay Fever, Of Thee I Sing, Oleanna, Beauty and the Beast, Johnny Guitar, Bells Are Ringing, On Shiloh Hill, Boogie Woogie Rumble of a Dream Deferred and Breakfast at Tiffany's, and productions of I Love My Wife and The Nerd.

== Personal life ==
Campbell was married to actress Nova Ball from 1987 to 1990. On October 10, 1999, he married actress Lauren Kennedy, with whom he appeared in Sunset Boulevard on Broadway. They are divorced and have one child, Riley Rose Campbell.

On April 24, 2008, Campbell and Kennedy opened the Lauren Kennedy and Alan Campbell Theater, which establishes a home for a burgeoning theater program at Barton College, a small liberal arts school in Wilson, North Carolina.

== Filmography ==
=== Film ===
Year	Title	Role	Notes
1983	The Final Terror	Kevin	a.k.a. Bump in the Night
1986	Weekend Warriors	Duckworth	a.k.a. Hollywood Air Force
1989	Tom, Dick and Harry	Tom	Short film
1997	A Simple Wish	Tony Sable	a.k.a. The Fairy Godmother
2020	Uncle Frank	Bernard	dir. Alan Ball
2024	Oh Canada	Mr. Calahan	dir. Paul Shrader

=== Television ===
Year	Title	Role	Notes
1979	B.J. and the Bear	Young Officer	Episode: "Run for the Money: Part 1"
1979	The Misadventures of Sheriff Lobo	Young Officer	Episode: "Run for the Money: Part 2"
1981	Red Flag: The Ultimate Game	Lt. Tommy Heinz	CBS TV film
1983	Another World	Evan Grant	
1984–1985	Three's a Crowd	E.Z. Taylor	18 episodes
1985	The Facts of Life	Chuck	Episode: "Ballroom Dance"
1986	Matlock	Palmer	Episode: "The Don: Parts 1 & 2"
1987–1992	Jake and the Fatman	Derek Mitchell	103 episodes
1998	Homicide: Life on the Street	Dr. Sanford	Episode: "Lies and Other Truths"
1998	Encore! Encore!	Alan Bloom	1 episode
2002	Live from Lincoln Center	Michael Wiley	Contact
2004	All My Children	Dr. Ellis Marshall	Recurring role
2006	Law & Order: Special Victims Unit	Mitchell Hissam	Episode: "Informed"
2008	Law & Order	Nolan Steele	Episode: "Driven"
2009–2011	Then We Got Help!	Thom	20 episodes
2011	Submissions Only	Sam Moriarty	Episode: "Intersections"
2021	Dopesick	Dr. Paul Goldenheim	4 episodes
2022	Servant	John-Michele	2 episodes

== Theatre ==
=== Broadway ===
Year	Title	Role	Theatre
1994–1997	Sunset Boulevard	Joe Gillis	Minskoff Theater
2002	Contact	Michael Wiley (replacement)	Vivian Beaumont Theater
2014–2015	Mamma Mia!	Sam Carmichael (replacement)	Broadhurst Theater

=== Off-Broadway ===
Year	Title	Role	Theatre
2000	Avow	Father Raymond	Century Center for the Performing Arts
2002	Book of Days	James Bates	Signature Theater
2007	Adrift in Macao	Mitch	59E59 Theater A
2011	Hello Again	The Senator	Transport Group, 52 Mercer Street
2015	Parade	Governor John Slaton	Avery Fisher Hall, New York City, New York

=== Regional ===
Year	Title	Role	Theater
1982	Boogie Woggie Rumble of a Dream Deferred	P.J.	Urban Arts Theater, New York City
1982	On Shiloh Hill	Johnny Reb	Westbeth Theater, New York City, New York
1984	Many Thousand Gone	Tom	Ford's Theater, Washington, D.C.
1985	Almos' a Man	Jimmy	Soho Repertory Theater, New York City, New York
1993	Sunset Boulevard	Joe Gillis	Shubert Theater, Los Angeles, California
1998	Bells Are Ringing	Jeff Moss	Kennedy Center, Washington, D.C.
1999	Book of Days	James Bates	The Repertory Theater of St. Louis, St. Louis, Missouri
2004	Breakfast at Tiffany's	Chip	The Muny, St. Louis, Missouri
2005	Beauty and the Beast	The Beast	North Carolina Theatre, Raleigh, North Carolina
2006	Johnny Guitar	The Dancin' Kid	La Mirada Theater for the Performing Arts, La Mirada, California
2007	Hay Fever	Richard Greatham	Old Globe, San Diego, California
2008	Oleanna	John	Gulfshore Playhouse, Naples, Florida
2008	Emmet Otter's Jug-Band Christmas	Russ, Pa	Goodspeed Opera House, East Haddam, Connecticut
2009	Doubt	Father Flynn	Gulfshore Playhouse, Naples, Florida
2010	12 Angry Men	Juror 8	Pioneer Theater, Salt Lake City, Utah
2010	Death and the Maiden	Gerardo Escobar	Kennedy Theater, Raleigh, North Carolina
2010	Dracula	Dr. Seward	Carolina Ballet, Raleigh, North Carolina
2012	Race	Jack Lawson	Kennedy Theater, Raleigh, North Carolina
2015	Seminar	Leonard	Wellfleet Harbor Actors Theater, Wellfleet, Massachusetts
2016	Alabama Story	Garth Williams	Wellfleet Harbor Actors Theater, Wellfleet, Massachusetts
2017	The Christians	Pastor Paul	Gulfshore Playhouse, Naples, Florida
2017	Rock and Roll Man	Alan Freed	Bucks County Playhouse, New Hope, Pennsylvania
2019	Rock and Roll Man	Alan Freed	Berkshire Theater Group/Colonial Theatre, Pittsfield, Massachusetts
2019	Witness for the Prosecution	Sir Wilfred Robarts	Judson Theater, Pinehurst, North Carolina
2023	The Refugees	Yates	Gulfshore Playhouse, Naples, Florida
2024	Dracula	Dr. Seward	Cleveland Ballet, Cleveland, Ohio
