= Briggs & Riley =

New York luggage manufacturer

Briggs & Riley Travelware
- Type: Private
- Industry: Retail
- Founded: Half Moon Bay, CA, USA (1993)
- Headquarters: Hauppauge, New York
- Key people: Richard Krulik, CEO
- Products: Fine luggage, business cases, computer backpacks, totes and travel accessories
- Website: briggs-riley.com, usluggage.com

Briggs & Riley Travelware is a manufacturer of luggage. The company is based in Hauppauge, New York and was founded in 1993 by Richard Costa. The company is known for its lifetime guarantee that also covers damage caused by an airline. Briggs & Riley products are distributed through independent retailers across the United States and Canada, as well as through its online store.

The company was acquired in August 2000 by Richard Krulik and U.S. Luggage LLC. U.S. Luggage was also the parent company of Solo New York, a company that makes business cases, until that brand was sold to CODi Worldwide in April, 2026.

Briggs & Riley manufactures a selection of travel bags. It was the first company to establish the NXpandable System that provides more space in the bag when expanded. It was also the first company to develop the Outsider handle, designed on the exterior of the case to ensure a flat packing area for wrinkle-free clothes.

The New York Times Wirecutter has rated Briggs & Riley products as their "upgrade pick".
