= It's Only Love (ZZ Top song) =

Single by ZZ Top

from the album Tejas
- B-side: "Asleep In The Desert"
- Released: 1976
- Genre: Blues rock
- Length: 4:24
- Label: London
- Songwriters: Billy Gibbons, Dusty Hill and Frank Beard
- Producer: Bill Ham

ZZ Top singles chronology
| "Tush" (1975) | "It's Only Love" (1976) | "Arrested for Driving While Blind" (1977) |

Official audio
- "It's Only Love (2019 Remaster)" on YouTube

"It's Only Love" is a song by American blues rock band ZZ Top. It was released as the lead single from their fifth studio album Tejas (1976).

Cash Box called it a "spare and driving rocker" with "good quality." Record World called it "a very Rolling Stones-ish number"

== Chart performance ==
"It's Only Love" peaked at number 44 on the Billboard Hot 100.

== Personnel ==
- Billy Gibbons – guitar, harmonica, lead vocals
- Dusty Hill – bass, co-lead vocals
- Frank Beard – drums

== Charts ==
| Chart (1976) | Peak position |
|---|---|
| US Billboard Hot 100 | 44 |
| US Cash Box Top 100 | 46 |
