= Whack Attack Tour =

2005 concert tour by ZZ Top

- Tour by ZZ Top
- Official tour poster
- Location: United States; Canada
- Start date: June 2, 2005
- End date: November 11, 2005
- Legs: 1
- No. of shows: 77

ZZ Top concert chronology
- Summer North American Tour (2004); Whack Attack Tour (2005); Hollywood Blues Tour (2007)

The Whack Attack Tour was a concert tour by rock band ZZ Top. Whack Attack was a 24-week-long tour in the United States and Canada, which was a longer outing than the previous Summer North American Tour. It began in June 2005 and ended in November 2005. The set was designed by Chris Stuba and had a 'retro garage' theme, with custom microphone stands and drum kit; tinsel was used as a backdrop. Risers were made out of diamond-plated steel. The set list highlighted material from the albums Mescalero (2003), Chrome, Smoke & BBQ (2003), and Rancho Texicano (2004). Billy Gibbons and Dusty Hill appeared on stage in sequined blazers. The show has received positive criticism, complimenting their showmanship, as well as the longevity of their signature sound and look.

== Stage design and show production ==
The Whack Attack Tour's production was designed by lighting technician Chris Stuba, who had worked with the band for the past eleven years. The backdrop was made of black and silver-colored tinsel, with drum and amplifier risers made of diamond-plated steel. Microphone stands were designed by John A. Douglas, who also designed the drum kit for Frank Beard used on the tour; the stands were made from truck exhaust pipes and were equipped with built-in LED tubes that changed color during the show, as well as Electro-Voice 664 dynamic microphones. The drum kit was painted with a lime green, leopard print design, including bass drums made with hubcaps on the outside and spun during the show. Gibbons and Hill used Crate V-50 2x12" combo amplifiers as monitors. The lighting package was supplied by Bandit Lites, consisting of mostly Vari-Lite fixtures including VL3500 spot lights.

== Tour dates ==
List of concerts, showing date, city, country, venue, and opening act(s)
Date	City	Country	Venue	Opening Act(s)
Leg 1: United States
June 2, 2005	Jackson	United States	Jackson Rancheria Casino Resort	
June 3, 2005	Oroville	United States	Feather Falls Casino	
June 4, 2005	Kelseyville	United States	Konocti Field Amphitheatre	Alien Cowboys
June 6, 2005	Livermore	United States	Wente Vineyards	
June 7, 2005	Laughlin	United States	Flamingo Outdoor Amphitheater	
June 9, 2005	Las Vegas	United States	Las Vegas Hilton	
June 10, 2005	Las Vegas	United States	Las Vegas Hilton	
June 11, 2005	Las Vegas	United States	Las Vegas Hilton	
June 12, 2005	Del Mar	United States	San Diego County Fair	
June 16, 2005	Hinckley	United States	Grand Casino Hinckley	
June 17, 2005	West Fargo	United States	Red River Valley Fair	
June 18, 2005	Burlington	United States	Burlington Steamboat Days	First Amendment
June 23, 2005	Albuquerque	United States	Sandia Casino Amphitheater	
June 24, 2005	Grand Junction	United States	Country Jam USA	Western Underground, Phil Vassar
June 25, 2005	Greeley	United States	Greeley Stampede	Montgomery Gentry
June 26, 2005	Manhattan	United States	Country Stampede	Lonestar, Chely Wright
July 8, 2005	Wallingford	United States	careerbuilder.com Oakdale Theatre	Keith Anderson
July 9, 2005	Big Flats	United States	Summer Stage at Tag's	Frostbit Blue
July 10, 2005	Quebec City	Canada	Quebec City Summer Festival	Steve Hill
July 12, 2005	Ottawa	Canada	Ottawa Bluesfest	David Gogo, Quarter Life
July 15, 2005	Comstock	United States	Comstock Rock	Smash Mouth, Quiet Riot
July 16, 2005	Columbia	United States	Amphitheater at Mizzou	
July 17, 2005	Cadott	United States	Rock Fest	Cheap Trick, Jackyl
July 21, 2005	London	Canada	Hawk Rocks the Park	Randy Bachman, Brian Howe
July 22, 2005	Ionia	United States	Ionia Free Fair	
July 23, 2005	Sault Ste. Marie	United States	Kewadin Casino, Hotel and Convention Center	George Thorogood
July 24, 2005	Twin Lakes	United States	Country Thunder	Lynyrd Skynyrd, Chelsi Howe
July 27, 2005	St. Charles	United States	Family Arena	Dean Hall
July 29, 2005	Tunica	United States	Grand Casino Tunica	
July 30, 2005	Gulfport	United States	Grand Casino Gulfport	
August 2, 2005	Merrillville	United States	Star Plaza Theatre	
August 5, 2005	Davenport	United States	Mississippi Valley Fair	
August 6, 2005	Evansville	United States	Mesker Amphitheatre	Tishara & the Earthtones
August 7, 2005	Columbus	United States	Celeste Center	Hot Apple Pie
August 10, 2005	Reading	United States	Sovereign Center	Will Hoge
August 11, 2005	Hamburg	United States	Erie County Fair	
August 12, 2005	Gilford	United States	Meadowbrook Musical Arts Center	Will Hoge
August 14, 2005	Saginaw	United States	WILZ Wheelzstock	Larry McCray
August 15, 2005	Lewisburg	United States	State Fair of West Virginia	
August 17, 2005	Detroit	United States	Michigan State Fair	
August 19, 2005	Des Moines	United States	Iowa State Fair	
August 23, 2005	Trenton	United States	Sovereign Bank Arena	Will Hoge
August 25, 2005	Rama	Canada	Casino Rama	
August 26, 2005	Rama	Canada	Casino Rama	
August 27, 2005	Canandaigua	United States	Finger Lakes Performing Arts Center	Junior Brown, Donna the Buffalo
August 28, 2005	Salisbury	United States	Wicomico Youth and Civic Center	
August 30, 2005	Augusta	United States	Augusta Civic Center	
August 31, 2005	Bushkill	United States	Mountain Laurel Center for the Performing Arts	Mark Farner
September 10, 2005	Spencer	United States	Clay County Fair	
September 11, 2005	Hutchinson	United States	Kansas State Fair	
September 13, 2005	Mankato	United States	Midwest Wireless Civic Center	
September 16, 2005	Oklahoma City	United States	Zoo Amphitheatre	Django Walker
September 17, 2005	Miami	United States	Buffalo Run Casino	
September 20, 2005	Central Point	United States	Britt Festival	Bastard Sons of Johnny Cash
September 21, 2005	Puyallup	United States	Western Washington Fair	—
September 23, 2005	Saratoga	United States	Montalvo Arts Center	—
September 24, 2005	Reno	United States	Reno Hilton Amphitheater	—
September 25, 2005	Pomona	United States	Los Angeles County Fair	—
September 28, 2005	Brooks	United States	Cache Creek Casino Resort	—
September 29, 2005	Santa Ynez	United States	Chumash Casino Resort	—
September 30, 2005	Alpine	United States	Viejas Casino	—
October 1, 2005	Tucson	United States	Anselmo Valencia Tori Amphitheater	—
October 5, 2005	Fresno	United States	Big Fresno Fair	—
October 7, 2005	Grand Ronde	United States	Spirit Mountain Casino	—
October 8, 2005	Goldendale	United States	Maryhill Winery & Amphitheater	—
October 9, 2005	Jackpot	United States	Cactus Pete's	—
October 11, 2005	Orem	United States	McKay Events Center	—
October 12, 2005	Colorado Springs	United States	World Arena	—
October 14, 2005	Kansas City	United States	Ameristar Casino Kansas City	—
October 18, 2005	Hollywood	United States	Hard Rock Live	—
October 20, 2005	Clearwater	United States	Ruth Eckerd Hall	Will Hoge
October 28, 2005	Charenton	United States	Cypress Bayou Pavilion	—
October 29, 2005	Charenton	United States	Cypress Bayou Pavilion	—
November 4, 2005	Phoenix	United States	Arizona Veterans Memorial Coliseum	—
November 10, 2005	New York City	United States	Beacon Theatre	—
November 11, 2005	New York City	United States	Beacon Theatre	—
