= Beer Drinkers and Hell Raisers Tour =

2003–04 concert tour by ZZ Top

- Tour by ZZ Top
- Location: North America; Europe
- Associated album: Mescalero
- Start date: April 25, 2003
- End date: September 25, 2004
- Legs: 5
- No. of shows: 137

ZZ Top concert chronology
- XXX Tour (1999–2002); Beer Drinkers and Hell Raisers Tour (2003–04); Summer North American Tour (2004)

The Beer Drinkers and Hell Raisers Tour was a concert tour through North America and Europe, undertaken by American rock band ZZ Top. Arranged in support of their 2003 album Mescalero, the band visited arenas, amphitheaters, and festivals from 2003 to 2004. To match the artistic theme that the group created with Mescalero, the tour was intended to differ from their past and surpass expectations of the band. Contrary to ZZ Top's elaborately staged multimedia events from previous tours, the Beer Drinkers and Hell Raisers Tour was a modest stage setup. It utilized minimalism by adorning "Mescalero" themed props on its stage. To escape their reputation for using stage gimmicks, ZZ Top embodied a more staid and focused image on tour. The Beer Drinkers and Hell Raisers Tour was central to Mescalero's success.

The tour's concept was inspired by resemblances of Mexico and the American Southwest. The stage featured a plaster model of a cantina doorway that was decorated with glitter and neon finish. Day of the Dead skeletons, sombreros and a toast were incorporated into the shows. On stage, both Billy Gibbons and Dusty Hill donned several costumes they designed, including rhinestone-embellished serapes, jackets, and oversized cowboy hats. In contrast to other ZZ Top tours, each of the Beer Drinkers and Hell Raisers shows opened with four to ten consecutive older songs before newer material was played.

Consisting of five legs and 137 shows, the tour began in Bossier City, Louisiana on April 25, 2003 and ended in Las Vegas, Nevada on September 25, 2004. The band visited the United States, Europe, and Mexico during the first four legs, before the final leg alternated with visits between the US and Canada. After the first four legs, the tour's itinerary was expanded for fairs, festivals, and casinos during the final leg, which was branded accordingly as a summer excursion. Although the tour provoked a variety of reactions from music critics, it was generally well received. Along with being one of the top-grossing North American tours of 2003 and 2004, Beer Drinkers and Hell Raisers sold over half-a-million tickets over its five legs. The band's compilation albums, Chrome, Smoke & BBQ and Rancho Texicano, were released during breaks in the tour, and most of their songs were incorporated into the main set. Critics held the Beer Drinkers and Hell Raisers Tour in high regard—in the Worcester Telegram & Gazette, Scott McLennan described the show as "a joyride".

== Tour dates ==
List of concerts, showing date, city, country, venue, tickets sold, number of available tickets and amount of gross revenue
| Date | City | Country | Venue | Opening act(s) | Attendance | Revenue |
Leg 1: arenas and amphitheaters in the United States
| April 25, 2003 | Bossier City | United States | CenturyTel Center | Ted Nugent | 6,300 / 7,500 | $248,850 |
| April 26, 2003 | Birmingham | United States | Oak Mountain Amphitheatre | Ted Nugent, Gov't Mule | — | — |
| April 29, 2003 | Selma | United States | Verizon Wireless Amphitheater | Kenny Wayne Shepherd | — | — |
| April 30, 2003 | Laredo | United States | Laredo Entertainment Center | Kenny Wayne Shepherd | — | — |
| May 2, 2003 | Jackson | United States | Mississippi Coliseum | Ted Nugent | — | — |
| May 3, 2003 | Oklahoma City | United States | Ford Center | Ted Nugent | 7,961 / 10,000 | $314,460 |
| May 4, 2003 | Memphis | United States | Tom Lee Park | Robert Randolph and the Family Band, Cowboy Mouth | — | — |
| May 7, 2003 | West Palm Beach | United States | Sound Advice Amphitheatre | Ted Nugent, Kenny Wayne Shepherd | — | — |
| May 9, 2003 | Raleigh | United States | Alltel Pavilion at Walnut Creek | Ted Nugent, Kenny Wayne Shepherd | — | — |
| May 10, 2003 | Charlotte | United States | Verizon Wireless Amphitheatre Charlotte | Ted Nugent, Kenny Wayne Shepherd | — | — |
| May 11, 2003 | Virginia Beach | United States | GTE Virginia Beach Amphitheater | Ted Nugent, Kenny Wayne Shepherd | — | — |
| May 13, 2003 | Bristow | United States | Nissan Pavilion | Ted Nugent, Kenny Wayne Shepherd | — | — |
| May 14, 2003 | Columbus | United States | Germain Amphitheater | Ted Nugent, Kenny Wayne Shepherd | — | — |
| May 16, 2003 | Pittsburgh | United States | Post Gazette Pavilion | Ted Nugent, Kenny Wayne Shepherd | — | — |
| May 17, 2003 | Noblesville | United States | Verizon Wireless Music Center | Ted Nugent, Kenny Wayne Shepherd | 9,594 / 24,790 | — |
| May 18, 2003 | Cleveland | United States | Tower City Amphitheater | Ted Nugent, Kenny Wayne Shepherd | — | — |
| May 20, 2003 | Mansfield | United States | Tweeter Center for the Performing Arts | Ted Nugent, Kenny Wayne Shepherd | — | — |
| May 21, 2003 | Camden | United States | Tweeter Center at the Waterfront | Ted Nugent, Kenny Wayne Shepherd | — | — |
| May 23, 2003 | Clarkston | United States | DTE Energy Music Theatre | Kenny Wayne Shepherd | 15,202 / 15,202 | $366,578 |
| May 24, 2003 | Tinley Park | United States | Tweeter Center Chicago | Ted Nugent, Kenny Wayne Shepherd | — | — |
| May 25, 2003 | East Troy | United States | Alpine Valley Music Theatre | Ted Nugent, Kenny Wayne Shepherd | 5,791 / 37,000 | $221,422 |
| May 27, 2003 | Cincinnati | United States | Riverbend Music Center | Ted Nugent, Kenny Wayne Shepherd | — | — |
| May 30, 2003 | Nashville | United States | AmSouth Amphitheatre | Ted Nugent, Kenny Wayne Shepherd | — | — |
| May 31, 2003 | Maryland Heights | United States | UMB Bank Pavilion | Ted Nugent, Kenny Wayne Shepherd | — | — |
| June 1, 2003 | Bonner Springs | United States | Verizon Wireless Amphitheater Kansas City | Ted Nugent, Kenny Wayne Shepherd | — | — |
| June 3, 2003 | Albuquerque | United States | Journal Pavilion | Ted Nugent, Kenny Wayne Shepherd | — | — |
| June 4, 2003 | Phoenix | United States | Cricket Wireless Pavilion | Ted Nugent, Kenny Wayne Shepherd | — | — |
| June 6, 2003 | Marysville | United States | Sleep Train Amphitheatre | Ted Nugent, Kenny Wayne Shepherd | — | — |
| June 7, 2003 | Devore | United States | Hyundai Pavilion | Ted Nugent, Kenny Wayne Shepherd | — | — |
| June 8, 2003 | Mountain View | United States | Shoreline Amphitheatre | Ted Nugent, Kenny Wayne Shepherd | — | — |
| June 12, 2003 | Tulsa | United States | Tulsa Convention Center | Kenny Wayne Shepherd | — | — |
| June 13, 2003 | Austin | United States | Frank Erwin Center | Kenny Wayne Shepherd | — | — |
| June 14, 2003 | Dallas | United States | American Airlines Center | Kenny Wayne Shepherd | — | — |
| June 17, 2003 | New Orleans | United States | Lakefront Arena | Ted Nugent | — | — |
| June 18, 2003 | Pensacola | United States | Pensacola Civic Center | Ted Nugent | — | — |
| June 20, 2003 | Orlando | United States | TD Waterhouse Centre | Ted Nugent | — | — |
| June 21, 2003 | Duluth | United States | Gwinnett Civic Center Arena | Ted Nugent | — | — |
Leg 2: arenas and festivals in Europe
| July 4, 2003 | Sundsvall | Sweden | Stora Scenen | GES, Dilba | — | — |
| July 5, 2003 | Sunne | Sweden | Rottneros Park | | — | — |
| July 6, 2003 | Oslo | Norway | Rockefeller Music Hall | | — | — |
| July 8, 2003 | Schwerin | Germany | Sport- und Kongresshalle | Mike Tramp | — | — |
| July 9, 2003 | Bonn | Germany | Museumsplatz | Mike Tramp | — | — |
| July 11, 2003 | Weert | Netherlands | Bospop | Gary Moore, Motörhead | — | — |
| July 12, 2003 | Oberkorn | Luxembourg | Centre Sportif de Differdange | Born | — | — |
| July 14, 2003 | Montereau | France | Parc des Noues | Van Wilks, Reverend Blues Gang | 2,700 / 10,000 | — |
| July 16, 2003 | Helsinki | Finland | Helsinki Olympic Stadium | The Hellacopters | — | — |
| July 18, 2003 | Erfurt | Germany | Messe Erfurt | Mike Tramp | — | — |
| July 20, 2003 | Montreux | Switzerland | Auditorium Stravinski | Krokus | — | — |
| July 21, 2003 | Zürich | Switzerland | Landesmuseum Zürich | Le Vibrazioni | — | — |
| July 23, 2003 | Budapest | Hungary | Petofi Csarnok | | — | — |
| July 24, 2003 | Dresden | Germany | Elbe | Mike Tramp | — | — |
| July 25, 2003 | Lauda-Königshofen | Germany | Tauber-Franken-Halle | Mike Tramp | — | — |
| July 27, 2003 | Birmingham | England | Carling Academy Birmingham | The Vaults | — | — |
| July 28, 2003 | Newcastle | England | Telewest Arena | The Vaults | — | — |
| July 29, 2003 | Liverpool | England | Liverpool Summer Pops | The Vaults | — | — |
| July 30, 2003 | London | England | Carling Academy Brixton | The Vaults | — | — |
| August 1, 2003 | Xanten | Germany | Amphitheatre | Mike Tramp | — | — |
| August 5, 2003 | Hannover | Germany | Gilde Parkbühne | Mike Tramp | — | — |
| August 6, 2003 | Hamburg | Germany | Hamburg Stadtpark | Mike Tramp | — | — |
| August 7, 2003 | Skanderborg | Denmark | Smukfest | Kashmir, Robert Plant | — | — |
| August 9, 2003 | Liège | Belgium | Plaine des Templiers | Mass Hysteria, Machiavel | — | — |
| August 11, 2003 | Colmar | France | Théâtre de Plein Air de Colmar | | — | — |
Leg 3: arenas and amphitheaters in the United States
| August 20, 2003 | Las Vegas | United States | Mandalay Bay Events Center | Franky Perez | — | — |
| August 22, 2003 | Kelseyville | United States | Konocti Harbor | Franky Perez | — | — |
| August 23, 2003 | Stateline | United States | Harveys Outdoor Arena | | — | — |
| August 24, 2003 | Lancaster | United States | Antelope Valley Fair | | — | — |
| August 26, 2003 | Englewood | United States | Fiddler's Green Amphitheatre | Jimmie Vaughan | — | — |
| August 27, 2003 | Lincoln | United States | Bob Devaney Sports Center | Franky Perez | — | — |
| August 29, 2003 | Grand Rapids | United States | Van Andel Arena | Ted Nugent | — | — |
| August 31, 2003 | Brookfield | United States | Yankee Lake | Ted Nugent, Left End | — | — |
| September 3, 2003 | Portland | United States | Cumberland County Civic Center | Ted Nugent | — | — |
| September 5, 2003 | Gilford | United States | Meadowbrook Musical Arts Center | Ted Nugent | — | — |
| September 6, 2003 | Big Flats | United States | Summer Stage at Tags | Ted Nugent | — | — |
| September 7, 2003 | Hershey | United States | Giant Center | David Lee Roth | — | — |
| September 12, 2003 | Green Bay | United States | Resch Center | Ted Nugent | — | — |
| September 13, 2003 | Somerset | United States | Float Rite Park Amphitheatre | Ted Nugent | — | — |
| September 17, 2003 | West Valley City | United States | USANA Amphitheatre | Ted Nugent | — | — |
| September 19, 2003 | Ridgefield | United States | Clark County Amphitheater | Ted Nugent | — | — |
| September 20, 2003 | George | United States | Gorge Amphitheatre | Ted Nugent | 8,610 / 13,500 | $423,518 |
Leg 4: arenas and amphitheaters in North America
| November 5, 2003 | Coarsegold | United States | Chukchansi Gold Resort & Casino | | — | — |
| November 7, 2003 | Bakersfield | United States | Bakersfield Centennial Garden | Franky Perez | — | — |
| November 8, 2003 | Santa Barbara | United States | Santa Barbara Bowl | Franky Perez | — | — |
| November 9, 2003 | Castaic | United States | Castaic Lake State Recreation Area | Lee Rocker | — | — |
| November 14, 2003 | Mexico City | Mexico | Palacio de los Deportes | Tex Tex | — | — |
| November 20, 2003 | Knoxville | United States | Knoxville Civic Coliseum | Cross Canadian Ragweed | — | — |
| November 21, 2003 | Robinsonville | United States | Grand Casino Tunica | | — | — |
| November 22, 2003 | Houston | United States | Compaq Center | Los Lobos, Cross Canadian Ragweed | — | — |
Leg 5: arenas and amphitheaters in North America ("El Cabron Tour")
| June 25, 2004 | Wichita Falls | United States | Kay Yeager Coliseum | The Fabulous Thunderbirds | — | — |
| June 26, 2004 | Beaumont | United States | Ford Park | Hank Williams Jr., Chris LeBlanc Band | 14,272 / 14,272 | $131,919 |
| June 28, 2004 | Hidalgo | United States | Dodge Arena | Reckless Kelly | 6,578 / 6,578 | — |
| July 1, 2004 | Mount Pleasant | United States | Soaring Eagle Casino & Resort | | — | — |
| July 3, 2004 | Muskegon | United States | Heritage Landing | Landing Strip | 17,000 / 17,000 | — |
| July 4, 2004 | Tinley Park | United States | Tweeter Center Chicago | The Doors of the 21st Century, Tesla | — | — |
| July 5, 2004 | Lansing | United States | Common Ground Music Festival | Gunner Ross and TNT | — | — |
| July 8, 2004 | Kelowna | Canada | Westside Bluff | Phat Betty, Mocking Shadows | — | — |
| July 10, 2004 | Craven | Canada | Qu'Appelle Valley | Nazareth, Spin Doctors | — | — |
| July 11, 2004 | Camrose | Canada | Camrose Exhibition Grounds | Sum 41, The Tea Party | — | — |
| July 14, 2004 | Walker | United States | Moondance Jam | Chris Robinson, Randall Zwarte Band | — | — |
| July 16, 2004 | Sarnia | Canada | Sarnia Bayfest | 9 House, The 88's | — | — |
| July 17, 2004 | St. Clairsville | United States | Jamboree in the Hills | Chris LeDoux, Jo Dee Messina | 21,624 / 35,000 | $651,083 |
| July 23, 2004 | Minot | United States | North Dakota State Fair | | — | — |
| July 24, 2004 | Cheyenne | United States | Cheyenne Frontier Days | Marshall Tucker Band | — | — |
| July 25, 2004 | Winter Park | United States | Winter Park Resort | War, Dave Mason | — | — |
| July 28, 2004 | Pala | United States | Pala Casino Resort and Spa | | — | — |
| July 30, 2004 | Kelseyville | United States | Konocti Harbor | Cross Canadian Ragweed | — | — |
| July 31, 2004 | Paso Robles | United States | Mid-State Fairgrounds Grandstand | Reckless Kelly | — | — |
| August 1, 2004 | Costa Mesa | United States | Pacific Amphitheatre | | — | — |
| August 3, 2004 | Kennewick | United States | Three Rivers Coliseum | Cross Canadian Ragweed | — | — |
| August 5, 2004 | Deer Island | United States | Columbia Meadows | Cross Canadian Ragweed | — | — |
| August 6, 2004 | Spokane | United States | Riverfront Park | Cross Canadian Ragweed | — | — |
| August 7, 2004 | Great Falls | United States | Four Seasons Arena | | 4,079 / 5,870 | $155,002 |
| August 9, 2004 | Sturgis | United States | Buffalo Chip Campground | | — | — |
| August 10, 2004 | Sioux Falls | United States | Sioux Empire Fair | | — | — |
| August 11, 2004 | Hayward | United States | LCO Casino Lodge & Convention Center | | — | — |
| August 13, 2004 | Sedalia | United States | Missouri State Fair | Franky Perez | — | — |
| August 14, 2004 | Oklahoma City | United States | Oklahoma City Zoo and Botanical Garden | Cardboard Vampyres | — | — |
| August 16, 2004 | Atlanta | United States | Chastain Park Amphitheater | | — | — |
| August 20, 2004 | Louisville | United States | Freedom Hall | Saliva | — | — |
| August 21, 2004 | Lima | United States | Allen County Fair | | — | — |
| August 24, 2004 | Pueblo | United States | Colorado State Fair | | — | — |
| August 26, 2004 | Green Bay | United States | Oneida Casino Pavilion | | — | — |
| August 27, 2004 | St. Paul | United States | Minnesota State Fair | Silvertide | — | — |
| September 1, 2004 | Syracuse | United States | New York State Fair | Cross Canadian Ragweed | 5,828 / 16,000 | — |
| September 2, 2004 | Allentown | United States | Allentown Fairgrounds | Reckless Kelly | 5,440 / 10,440 | $212,160 |
| September 3, 2004 | Essex Junction | United States | Champlain Valley Fairgrounds Grandstand | | — | — |
| September 10, 2004 | Blackfoot | United States | Eastern Idaho State Fair | | — | — |
| September 11, 2004 | Grand Junction | United States | Country Jam Ranch | Dickey Betts, Eddie Money | — | — |
| September 12, 2004 | Albuquerque | United States | Sandia Casino Amphitheater | | — | — |
| September 16, 2004 | Puyallup | United States | Puyallup Fair | | — | — |
| September 17, 2004 | Bend | United States | Les Schwab Amphitheater | Eric Sardinas | — | — |
| September 18, 2004 | Reno | United States | Reno Hilton | Cowboy Mouth | — | — |
| September 20, 2004 | Laughlin | United States | Flamingo Laughlin | | — | — |
| September 21, 2004 | Laughlin | United States | Flamingo Laughlin | | — | — |
| September 23, 2004 | Alpine | United States | Viejas Casino | | — | — |
| September 24, 2004 | Las Vegas | United States | Las Vegas Hilton | | — | — |
| September 25, 2004 | Las Vegas | United States | Las Vegas Hilton | | — | — |
