= Country Jam =

Country Jam may refer to:

- Country Jam USA, annual country music festival held in Eau Claire, Wisconsin
- Country Jam (Colorado), annual country music festival held in Loma, Colorado
