= Mescalero (album) =

Studio album by ZZ Top
- Released: September 8, 2003 (worldwide); September 9, 2003 (United States)
- Recorded: 2002
- Studios: Foam Box Recordings (Houston, Texas, United States)
- Genres: Blues rock; country; Tejano
- Length: 61:27
- Label: RCA
- Producer: Billy Gibbons

ZZ Top chronology
XXX (1999)	Mescalero (2003)	Chrome, Smoke & BBQ (2003)

Mescalero is the fourteenth studio album by the American rock band ZZ Top. It was released in September 2003, as the band's final release for RCA Records. While the band still retained their foundation in blues rock, Mescalero explored genres like country and Tejano. Recording sessions took place at Foam Box Recordings in Houston, with Billy Gibbons as producer.

== Background and recording ==
In 1993, ZZ Top signed with RCA Records, which produced Antenna (1994), Rhythmeen (1996), and XXX, the latter of which marked the band's thirtieth anniversary and received mixed reviews from critics. They mostly toured in the years between XXX and Mescalero, visiting Australia, New Zealand and various countries in Europe. In 2002, the band performed at the annual RodeoHouston and with Brooks & Dunn on CMT Crossroads. They went on a short Casino Tour in the United States and European Tour.

In 2002, ZZ Top convened at Foam Box Recordings in Houston, a private studio owned by the band that was used to record XXX and Rhythmeen. Gibbons produced the project and wrote most of the songs, collaborating with the engineers Joe Hardy and Gary Moon, as well as band members Dusty Hill and Frank Beard. A variety of instruments was used on Mescalero. After taking a lunch break at a Mexican restaurant, ZZ Top hired a father-and-son marimba duo from Chiapas, Mexico. They provided entertainment at the restaurant and were anxious to appear on a rock album. After explaining that there were only three chords involved, they played on the title track. James Harman played harmonica on "Que Lastima", a title meaning 'what a pity'.

=== Music ===
Mescalero is centered on a variety of Tejano instrumentation including accordion, pedal steel guitar, and harmonica. The album often uses slide guitar and "fuzzy" bass guitar sounds. It opens with "Mescalero", a track with marimbas used throughout the entire song and a solo at the end. "Two Ways to Play" is a hard rock-inspired track in which Gibbons' guitar is tuned down a whole step from standard pitch. "Alley-Gator" made use of the accordion and a 1955 Gibson Les Paul Goldtop played by Gibbons. "Buck Nekkid" is a moderate swing, while "Goin' So Good" is a slow ballad on which Gibbons used a 1949 Fender Telecaster prototype and played Steve Cropper-tinged licks; he traded phrases in call and response form with a pedal steel guitar. "Me So Stupid" is a moderate rock with a clip of Gibbons' voice remaining constant throughout the track. Dusty Hill sang lead vocals on "Piece". Auto-Tune is used on Gibbons' vocals at several points on the album, most audibly on "What Would You Do", "Que Lastima" and "As Time Goes By".

=== Album art ===
The album depicts a skeleton wearing a sarape and a sombrero while drinking mescal in the desert. The skeleton appears to be shooting flames out of its mouth. The title, Mescalero, refers to a heavy mescal drinker.

=== Promotion ===
In 2003, ZZ Top showcased two tracks from Mescalero in a performance at RodeoHouston in Texas. "Buck Nekkid" was used in a television commercial promoting the album.

== Reception ==
Professional ratings
Review scores
Source	Rating
AllMusic	2/5 stars
The Austin Chronicle	2.5/5 stars
laut.de	4/5 stars
Orlando Sentinel	2/5 stars
The Rolling Stone Album Guide	3.5/5 stars
Sputnikmusic	4/5
Tom Hull	A−

Allmusic awarded the album two out of five stars, with Stephen Thomas Erlewine describing thirteen tracks as "by-the-books latter-day ZZ Top relying too much on overly polished sound and familiar form" and writing that the band sounded "like a worthy veteran act" on "Liquid", "Crunchy", "What Would You Do", and "Tramp".

The album peaked at number 57 on the Billboard 200.

== Tour ==
Following Mescalero's release, ZZ Top embarked on the Beer Drinkers and Hell Raisers Tour (April–November 2003). The tour spanned three months in the US with Ted Nugent (featuring drummer Tommy Aldridge and bassist Marco Mendoza) as the middle act, and Kenny Wayne Shepherd (with Double Trouble) as the opener, with a European leg visiting twelve countries and included a concert in Helsinki, Finland, as special guests with The Rolling Stones. After returning to the United States for more performances, ZZ Top appeared on The Tonight Show with Jay Leno; they played at the Compaq Center (previously known as The Summit); this was the last event to be held in the venue. The band continued touring to support Mescalero throughout summer 2004 and performed at the Crossroads Guitar Festival.

== Track listing ==
All tracks are written by Billy Gibbons, except where noted.

Standard edition
No.	Title	Writer(s)	Length
1.	"Mescalero"		3:50
2.	"Two Ways to Play"		4:15
3.	"Alley-Gator"		3:29
4.	"Buck Nekkid"		3:02
5.	"Goin' So Good"		5:34
6.	"Me So Stupid"	Gibbons, Joe Hardy, Gary Moon	3:33
7.	"Piece"		4:19
8.	"Punk Ass Boyfriend"		3:05
9.	"Stackin' Paper"	Gibbons, Hardy	2:58
10.	"What Would You Do"		3:03
11.	"What It Is Kid"	Gibbons, Dusty Hill, Frank Beard	4:13
12.	"Que Lastima"		4:24
13.	"Tramp"	Lowell Fulson, Jimmy McCracklin	5:12
14.	"Crunchy"		3:13
15.	"Dusted"		3:55
16.	"Liquor"		3:22
Total length:			61:27

Japanese release bonus track
No.	Title	Writer(s)	Length
17.	"Sanctify"	Gibbons, Hill, Beard	4:20

Hidden track
No.	Title	Writer(s)	Length
18.	"As Time Goes By"	Herman Hupfeld	4:27

== Personnel ==
=== ZZ Top ===
- Billy Gibbons – guitar, vocals, producer
- Dusty Hill – bass guitar, backing vocals, lead vocal on "Piece"
- Frank Beard – drums, percussion

=== Additional personnel ===
- Marimbas de Chiapas – marimba
- Dan Dugmore – pedal steel guitar
- James Harman – harmonica

=== Technical ===
- Joe Hardy – engineer, mixing
- Gary Moon – mastering
- Steve Ralbovsky – A&R
- Ryk Maverick – album cover design
- Mike Waring – photography

== Charts ==
Album – Billboard (United States)

Year	Chart	Position
2003	The Billboard 200	57
