= What's Up with That =

What's Up with That may refer to:

== Film and TV ==
- "What Up with That?", a Saturday Night Live sketch featuring Kenan Thompson begun in 2009
- "What's up with that?" punchline of the April Fool in the Nickelodeon animated series The Fairly OddParents

== Internet ==
- Watts Up With That?, a climate change denial blog created by blogger Anthony Watts

== Music ==
- "What Up With That", song in the Saturday Night Live sketch of the same name
- "What's Up with That" (ZZ Top song), 1996 single composed by Billy Gibbons and Joe Hardy
- "What's Up with That", single by Scotty Emerick, featured in the soundtrack to the film Broken Bridges 2006
- "What's Up with That", music video by Veronica Ballestrini 2007
- "What's Up With That", song by Master P (featuring Silk) from Get Away Clean 1991
- "What's Up With That", song by Curtis Salgado from Clean Getaway 2008
- "What's Up With That", song by The Dictators
- "What's Up With That", song by Pee Wee Ellis composed by Alfred Ellis
- "What's Up With That Girl?", single by Shocking Pinks
- "What's Up with That Woman", song by Buddy Guy from Rhythm & Blues
