= XXX Tour =

1999–2002 concert tour by ZZ Top

- World tour by ZZ Top
- Location: United States; Australasia; Europe
- Associated album: XXX
- Start date: September 12, 1999
- End date: November 1, 2002
- Legs: 5
- No. of shows: 134

ZZ Top concert chronology
- Continental Safari Tour (1996–97); XXX Tour (1999–2002); Beer Drinkers and Hell Raisers Tour (2003–04)

The XXX Tour was a worldwide concert tour by American rock band ZZ Top. Staged in support of their 1999 album XXX, the tour visited arenas and stadiums from 1999 to 2002. With five legs and 134 shows, the tour began in Denver, Colorado on September 12, 1999 and ended on November 1, 2002 in London, England. The first two legs took place in the United States before the next leg visited Australasia. After three legs, the band was initially expected to tour Europe, but the European leg was postponed until over two years later, which was branded as "Euro-Afrique". Although the tour provoked a range of reactions from critics, it was generally well received.

== Background ==
ZZ Top's 1996 album Rhythmeen and the supporting Continental Safari Tour brought them to new audiences, particularly in South Africa. Unlike their previous tours, Continental Safari was a minimalistic, sparse production. According to a press release, guitarist and vocalist Billy Gibbons described the tour's production as a "no-frills, full-thrill presentation—streamlined and down and gritty", further acknowledging, "ZZ Top drives it home with a meaner rhythm than ever before." Although their 1997 Mean Rhythm Global Tour did not visit Europe, they performed over 170 shows in support of Rhythmeen.

== Stage design and production ==
The XXX Tour stage was designed by Chris Stuba, ZZ Top's lighting director. To design the set, Stuba collaborated with longtime production manager Donny Stuart stage set. In place of ZZ Top's elaborate productions of the past, the XXX Tour stage was a simple setup, designed to be intimate. The set included a 48-by-30 foot (15 by 9 m) stage, and was supplemented by giant stretch fabric fixtures, known as Transformits, and were made into geometric shapes, which showed various visuals, including the "XXX" logo behind the stage; for any in-the-round venues, the Transformits were not used. Stuba faced the challenge of designing a lighting system to suit both ZZ Top and Lynyrd Skynyrd, the opening act for most of the tour; both bands used the same wash lights. The set used 87 automated luminaries and 180 PAR lamps, emitting much heat in which the band favored. Stuba explained:

Because the band has literally grown up with conventional lights, they tell me they play better when they 'feel the heat'. They like a really hot stage. The story is they had so many PARs they couldn't move the drum riser until a half hour after the show because it was so hot. They like it that way, and as more conventional lighting goes away and more automated lighting comes into play, a lot of newer bands have no idea what it's like to play under a 150-degree stage. It's an observation we've made about the whole thing, from Billy's point of view. The way we discovered this was, I was running moving light cues and Billy was saying there was something missing and he couldn't put his finger on it. And it came to turn out that it was just the heat factor. He missed the heat. I was pretty shocked hearing that and didn't give it much thought myself until he pointed that out. Our cues now have more PARs in them just for that reason. If they're happy with the heat and they don't think about it and it's the norm, then in turn they probably do play better.

== Tour dates ==
List of concerts, showing date, city, country, venue, tickets sold, number of available tickets and amount of gross revenue
Date	City	Country	Venue	Opening act(s)	Attendance	Revenue
Leg 1: arenas in the United States
September 12, 1999	Denver	United States	McNichols Sports Arena	The Groove Hawgs	—	—
September 15, 1999	Pensacola	United States	Pensacola Civic Center	Lynyrd Skynyrd, Screamin' Cheetah Wheelies	—	—
September 17, 1999	Orlando	United States	Orlando Arena	Lynyrd Skynyrd, Screamin' Cheetah Wheelies	—	—
September 18, 1999	Fort Lauderdale	United States	National Car Rental Center	Lynyrd Skynyrd, Screamin' Cheetah Wheelies	—	—
September 19, 1999	Gainesville	United States	O'Connell Center	Lynyrd Skynyrd	—	—
September 21, 1999	Greenville	United States	Bi-Lo Center	Lynyrd Skynyrd, Screamin' Cheetah Wheelies	—	—
September 22, 1999	Greensboro	United States	Greensboro Coliseum	Lynyrd Skynyrd, Screamin' Cheetah Wheelies	6,822 / 23,500	—
September 24, 1999	Charlotte	United States	Charlotte Coliseum	Lynyrd Skynyrd, Screamin' Cheetah Wheelies	—	—
September 25, 1999	Birmingham	United States	Birmingham-Jefferson Civic Center Arena	Lynyrd Skynyrd, Screamin' Cheetah Wheelies	—	—
September 26, 1999	Knoxville	United States	Thompson–Boling Arena	Lynyrd Skynyrd, Screamin' Cheetah Wheelies	—	—
September 28, 1999	Atlanta	United States	Philips Arena	Lynyrd Skynyrd, Screamin' Cheetah Wheelies	—	—
September 29, 1999	Roanoke	United States	Roanoke Civic Center	Lynyrd Skynyrd, Screamin' Cheetah Wheelies	9,408 / 9,828	—
October 1, 1999	Hampton	United States	Hampton Coliseum	Lynyrd Skynyrd	—	—
October 2, 1999	Philadelphia	United States	First Union Spectrum	Lynyrd Skynyrd, Screamin' Cheetah Wheelies	—	—
October 3, 1999	Pittsburgh	United States	Pittsburgh Civic Arena	Lynyrd Skynyrd, Screamin' Cheetah Wheelies	—	—
October 6, 1999	Buffalo	United States	Marine Midland Arena	Lynyrd Skynyrd, Screamin' Cheetah Wheelies	—	—
October 8, 1999	East Rutherford	United States	Continental Airlines Arena	Lynyrd Skynyrd, Screamin' Cheetah Wheelies	—	—
October 9, 1999	Worcester	United States	Worcester's Centrum Centre	Lynyrd Skynyrd, Screamin' Cheetah Wheelies	—	—
October 10, 1999	Fairfax	United States	Patriot Center	Lynyrd Skynyrd, Screamin' Cheetah Wheelies	—	—
October 12, 1999	Cleveland	United States	CSU Convocation Center	Lynyrd Skynyrd, Screamin' Cheetah Wheelies	—	—
October 13, 1999	Fairborn	United States	Ervin J. Nutter Center	Lynyrd Skynyrd, Screamin' Cheetah Wheelies	—	—
October 15, 1999	Grand Rapids	United States	Van Andel Arena	Lynyrd Skynyrd, Screamin' Cheetah Wheelies	—	—
October 16, 1999	Detroit	United States	Palace of Auburn Hills	Lynyrd Skynyrd, Screamin' Cheetah Wheelies	13,896 / 13,896	$476,361
October 17, 1999	Indianapolis	United States	Market Square Arena	Lynyrd Skynyrd	—	—
October 19, 1999	Moline	United States	MARK of the Quad Cities	Lynyrd Skynyrd	—	—
October 20, 1999	Madison	United States	Kohl Center	Lynyrd Skynyrd	—	—
October 22, 1999	Chicago	United States	United Center	Lynyrd Skynyrd, Screamin' Cheetah Wheelies	—	—
October 23, 1999	Ames	United States	Hilton Coliseum	Lynyrd Skynyrd	7,362 / 14,092	—
October 24, 1999	Fargo	United States	Fargodome	Lynyrd Skynyrd	—	—
October 26, 1999	Minneapolis	United States	Target Center	Lynyrd Skynyrd, Screamin' Cheetah Wheelies	—	—
October 28, 1999	Kansas City	United States	Kansas City Municipal Auditorium	Lynyrd Skynyrd, Screamin' Cheetah Wheelies	—	—
October 29, 1999	St. Louis	United States	Kiel Center	Lynyrd Skynyrd, Screamin' Cheetah Wheelies	—	—
October 30, 1999	Memphis	United States	Pyramid Arena	Lynyrd Skynyrd, Screamin' Cheetah Wheelies	13,621 / 13,621	$489,795
November 5, 1999	New Orleans	United States	New Orleans Arena	Lynyrd Skynyrd, Screamin' Cheetah Wheelies	—	—
November 6, 1999	Jackson	United States	Mississippi Coliseum	Lynyrd Skynyrd, Screamin' Cheetah Wheelies	—	—
November 7, 1999	Nashville	United States	Nashville Arena	Lynyrd Skynyrd, Screamin' Cheetah Wheelies	—	—
November 9, 1999	Shreveport	United States	Hirsch Memorial Coliseum	Lynyrd Skynyrd, Screamin' Cheetah Wheelies	—	—
November 10, 1999	Little Rock	United States	Alltel Arena	Lynyrd Skynyrd, Screamin' Cheetah Wheelies	—	—
November 12, 1999	Oklahoma City	United States	Myriad Convention Center	Lynyrd Skynyrd, Screamin' Cheetah Wheelies	—	—
November 13, 1999	Tulsa	United States	Tulsa Convention Center	Lynyrd Skynyrd, Screamin' Cheetah Wheelies	—	—
November 14, 1999	Wichita	United States	Britt Brown Arena	Lynyrd Skynyrd, Screamin' Cheetah Wheelies	—	—
November 16, 1999	Omaha	United States	Omaha Civic Auditorium Arena	Lynyrd Skynyrd	—	—
November 17, 1999	Rapid City	United States	Rushmore Plaza Civic Center	Lynyrd Skynyrd	—	—
November 19, 1999	Salt Lake City	United States	Delta Center	Lynyrd Skynyrd, Screamin' Cheetah Wheelies	—	—
November 21, 1999	Billings	United States	MetraPark Arena	Lynyrd Skynyrd, Screamin' Cheetah Wheelies	—	—
November 22, 1999	Missoula	United States	Adams Center	Lynyrd Skynyrd	—	—
November 24, 1999	Tacoma	United States	Tacoma Dome	Lynyrd Skynyrd, Screamin' Cheetah Wheelies	—	—
November 26, 1999	Spokane	United States	Spokane Arena	Lynyrd Skynyrd, Screamin' Cheetah Wheelies	—	—
November 27, 1999	Portland	United States	Rose Garden Arena	Lynyrd Skynyrd, Screamin' Cheetah Wheelies	—	—
November 28, 1999	Boise	United States	Idaho Center	Lynyrd Skynyrd, Screamin' Cheetah Wheelies	—	—
November 30, 1999	Reno	United States	Lawlor Events Center	Lynyrd Skynyrd	—	—
December 1, 1999	Sacramento	United States	ARCO Arena	Lynyrd Skynyrd, Screamin' Cheetah Wheelies	—	—
December 3, 1999	Oakland	United States	The Arena in Oakland	Lynyrd Skynyrd, Sy Klopps Blues Band	—	—
December 4, 1999	Anaheim	United States	Arrowhead Pond of Anaheim	Lynyrd Skynyrd	—	—
December 5, 1999	San Diego	United States	San Diego Sports Arena	Lynyrd Skynyrd	—	—
December 7, 1999	Las Vegas	United States	Mandalay Bay Events Center	Lynyrd Skynyrd, Screamin' Cheetah Wheelies	—	—
December 9, 1999	Tucson	United States	Tucson Convention Center	Lynyrd Skynyrd, Screamin' Cheetah Wheelies	7,379 / 8,962	$258,265
December 10, 1999	Phoenix	United States	America West Arena	Lynyrd Skynyrd, Screamin' Cheetah Wheelies	—	—
December 11, 1999	Albuquerque	United States	Tingley Coliseum	Lynyrd Skynyrd, Screamin' Cheetah Wheelies	—	—
December 14, 1999	Odessa	United States	Ector County Coliseum	Screamin' Cheetah Wheelies	—	—
December 16, 1999	Lubbock	United States	Lubbock Municipal Coliseum	Lynyrd Skynyrd, Screamin' Cheetah Wheelies	—	—
December 17, 1999	Dallas	United States	Reunion Arena	Lynyrd Skynyrd, Screamin' Cheetah Wheelies	14,654 / 14,654	$579,290
December 29, 1999	Lafayette	United States	Cajundome	Lynyrd Skynyrd, Jivin’ Sister Fanny	—	—
December 30, 1999	Austin	United States	Frank Erwin Center	Lynyrd Skynyrd, Jivin’ Sister Fanny	—	—
December 31, 1999	Houston	United States	Houston Compaq Center	Lynyrd Skynyrd, Jivin’ Sister Fanny	11,777 / 11,777	$681,372
Leg 2: arenas in the United States
January 14, 2000	Hershey	United States	Hersheypark Arena	Lynyrd Skynyrd, The Demonseeds	—	—
January 15, 2000	Charleston	United States	Charleston Civic Center	Lynyrd Skynyrd, The Demonseeds	11,423 / 11,423	$379,891
January 16, 2000	Wheeling	United States	Wheeling Civic Center	Lynyrd Skynyrd, The Demonseeds	—	—
January 18, 2000	Wilkes-Barre	United States	Northeastern Pennsylvania Civic Arena	Lynyrd Skynyrd, Laidlaw	—	—
January 19, 2000	Rochester	United States	Blue Cross Arena	Lynyrd Skynyrd, Laidlaw	5,147 / 10,877	—
January 21, 2000	Hartford	United States	Hartford Civic Center	Lynyrd Skynyrd, Laidlaw	9,784 / 12,500	$334,342
January 22, 2000	Providence	United States	Providence Civic Center	Lynyrd Skynyrd, Laidlaw	—	—
January 23, 2000	Uniondale	United States	Nassau Coliseum	Lynyrd Skynyrd, Laidlaw	—	—
January 25, 2000	Albany	United States	Pepsi Arena	Lynyrd Skynyrd, Laidlaw	8,899 / 10,000	$297,211
January 26, 2000	Portland	United States	Cumberland County Civic Center	Lynyrd Skynyrd, Laidlaw	8,068 / 8,068	$282,380
January 28, 2000	Uncasville	United States	Mohegan Sun Arena		—	—
January 29, 2000	Atlantic City	United States	Trump Marina		—	—
February 2, 2000	Tampa	United States	Ice Palace Arena	Lynyrd Skynyrd, Laidlaw	—	—
February 4, 2000	Savannah	United States	Savannah Civic Center	Lynyrd Skynyrd, Laidlaw	—	—
February 5, 2000	Tupelo	United States	Tupelo Coliseum	Lynyrd Skynyrd, Laidlaw	—	—
February 6, 2000	Biloxi	United States	Mississippi Coast Coliseum	Lynyrd Skynyrd, Laidlaw	—	—
February 8, 2000	Louisville	United States	Freedom Hall	Lynyrd Skynyrd, Laidlaw	11,116 / 13,000	$341,567
February 9, 2000	Huntsville	United States	Von Braun Civic Center	Lynyrd Skynyrd, Laidlaw	7,862 / 7,862	$269,867
February 11, 2000	Johnson City	United States	Freedom Hall Civic Center	Lynyrd Skynyrd, Laidlaw	7,958 / 7,958	$278,530
February 13, 2000	Fort Worth	United States	Fort Worth Convention Center	Lynyrd Skynyrd, Laidlaw	11,923 / 11,923	$492,155
February 16, 2000	Macon	United States	Macon Coliseum	Lynyrd Skynyrd, Laidlaw	—	—
February 18, 2000	Albany	United States	Albany Civic Center	Lynyrd Skynyrd, Laidlaw	—	—
February 19, 2000	North Charleston	United States	North Charleston Coliseum	Lynyrd Skynyrd, Laidlaw	—	—
February 20, 2000	Raleigh	United States	Raleigh Entertainment & Sports Arena	Lynyrd Skynyrd, Laidlaw	—	—
February 22, 2000	Toledo	United States	Savage Hall	Lynyrd Skynyrd, Laidlaw	—	—
February 23, 2000	Kalamazoo	United States	Wings Stadium	Lynyrd Skynyrd, Laidlaw	—	—
February 25, 2000	Cincinnati	United States	Cincinnati Gardens	Lynyrd Skynyrd, Laidlaw	—	—
February 26, 2000	Columbus	United States	Value City Arena	Lynyrd Skynyrd, Laidlaw	—	—
February 27, 2000	Evansville	United States	Roberts Municipal Stadium	Lynyrd Skynyrd, Laidlaw	—	—
February 29, 2000	Peoria	United States	Peoria Civic Center	Lynyrd Skynyrd, Laidlaw	—	—
March 2, 2000	Terre Haute	United States	Hulman Center	Lynyrd Skynyrd, Laidlaw	6,086 / 10,200	—
March 3, 2000	Cape Girardeau	United States	Show Me Center	Lynyrd Skynyrd, Laidlaw	—	—
March 5, 2000	Beaumont	United States	Montagne Center	Lynyrd Skynyrd, Laidlaw	—	—
Leg 3: arenas and stadiums in Australasia
April 17, 2000	Perth	Australia	Perth Entertainment Centre		—	—
April 19, 2000	Adelaide	Australia	Adelaide Entertainment Centre	Orianthi	—	—
April 21, 2000	Byron Bay	Australia	Red Devil Park	Robert Cray Band, Béla Fleck & the Flecktones	—	—
April 22, 2000	Brisbane	Australia	Brisbane Entertainment Centre		—	—
April 24, 2000	Sydney	Australia	Sydney Entertainment Centre	Never the Bride	—	—
April 26, 2000	Melbourne	Australia	Melbourne Park		—	—
April 28, 2000	Auckland	New Zealand	Ericsson Stadium Supertop	Delta	—	—
April 30, 2000	Christchurch	New Zealand	WestpacTrust Centre	Delta	—	—
May 1, 2000	Wellington	New Zealand	Queens Wharf Events Centre	Delta	—	—
Leg 4: arenas and stadiums in the United States ("Casino Tour")
May 4, 2002	Atlantic City	United States	Etess Arena		—	—
May 7, 2002	Uncasville	United States	Mohegan Sun Arena		—	—
May 9, 2002	Albuquerque	United States	Sandia Resort and Casino		—	—
May 11, 2002	Paradise	United States	Aladdin Theatre for the Performing Arts		—	—
May 12, 2002	Alpine	United States	Viejas Casino		—	—
Leg 5: auditoriums and arenas in Europe ("Euro-Afrique")
October 1, 2002	Helsinki	Finland	Hartwall Areena	Gary Moore	—	—
October 3, 2002	Stockholm	Sweden	Hovet	Gary Moore	—	—
October 5, 2002	Aalborg	Denmark	Aalborg Stadion	Gary Moore	—	—
October 7, 2002	Copenhagen	Denmark	Falkoner Teatret	Gary Moore	—	—
October 8, 2002	Hamburg	Germany	Alsterdorfer Sporthalle	Gary Moore	—	—
October 10, 2002	Berlin	Germany	Velodrom	Gary Moore	—	—
October 11, 2002	Leipzig	Germany	Arena Leipzig	Gary Moore	—	—
October 12, 2002	Frankfurt	Germany	Jahrhunderthalle	Gary Moore	—	—
October 14, 2002	Paris	France	Zénith de Paris	Gary Moore	—	—
October 15, 2002	Saarbrücken	Germany	E-Werk	Gary Moore	—	—
October 16, 2002	Brussels	Belgium	Forest National	Gary Moore	—	—
October 18, 2002	Essen	Germany	Grugahalle	Gary Moore	—	—
October 19, 2002	Munich	Germany	Olympiahalle	Gary Moore	—	—
October 20, 2002	Stuttgart	Germany	Schleyerhalle	Gary Moore	—	—
October 22, 2002	Vienna	Austria	Spark7 Halle	Gary Moore	—	—
October 23, 2002	Brno	Czech Republic	Hala Rondo	Gary Moore	—	—
October 24, 2002	Zagreb	Croatia	Dom Sportova		—	—
October 26, 2002	Zürich	Switzerland	Hallenstadion	Gary Moore	—	—
October 27, 2002	Milan	Italy	PalaVobis	Gary Moore	—	—
October 29, 2002	Amsterdam	Netherlands	Heineken Music Hall	Gary Moore	—	—
October 31, 2002	Manchester	England	Manchester Apollo	Gary Moore	—	—
November 1, 2002	London	England	Carling Apollo Hammersmith	Headway	—	—
