= El Camino Ocho Tour =

2008 concert tour by ZZ Top

- Tour by ZZ Top
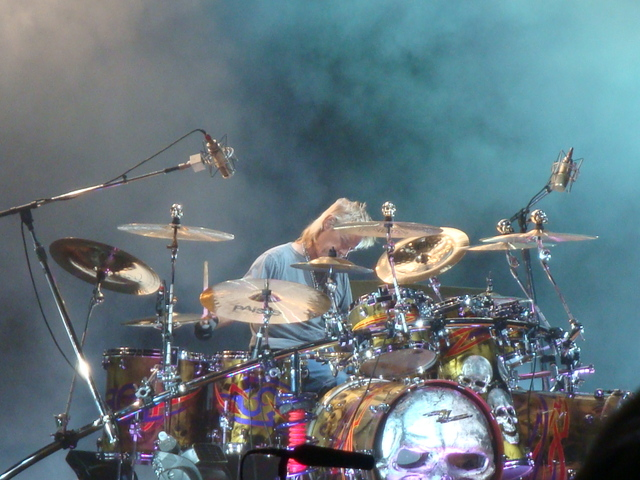
- Location: North America; Europe
- Start date: May 2, 2008
- End date: September 9, 2008
- Legs: 3
- No. of shows: 60

ZZ Top concert chronology
- Hollywood Blues Tour (2007); El Camino Ocho Tour (2008); In Your Face Tour (2009)

The El Camino Ocho Tour was a concert tour through North America and Europe, undertaken by American rock band ZZ Top. The tour's concerts were performed in casinos and fairs from May through September 2008. Band members Billy Gibbons and Dusty Hill dressed in black biker jackets, along with baseball caps and boots. The El Camino Ocho Tour consisted of three legs and 60 shows. Some of the tour was depicted in the concert film Double Down Live.

== Concert overview ==
Out of the 60 shows performed, each had a similar set list, with 16–21 songs performed. The concerts usually began with techno music played through the PA system, during which the band would walk on stage and begin the show.

=== Main set ===
The first leg of the tour opened with "Gimme All Your Lovin'", while the second and third legs opened with "Got Me Under Pressure". Following the opener, the band performed "Waitin' for the Bus", "Jesus Just Left Chicago", "Chevrolet", and "Pincushion". Every show featured "I'm Bad, I'm Nationwide", along with "Heard It on the X", "Just Got Paid", "I Need You Tonight", "Cheap Sunglasses", and "Planet of Women". "Sharp Dressed Man" and "Legs" were also included.

=== Encores ===
The encores typically started with "Tube Snake Boogie". This segued into a medley of "La Grange", "Sloppy Drunk Blues", and "Bar-B-Q". The encores usually closed out with "Tush". "Jailhouse Rock" was also occasionally performed.

=== Additional songs ===
A total of 24 different songs were played throughout the tour. "My Head's In Mississippi" was featured as a snippet for a few shows. "I Thank You" was played for the first nine concerts. "It's Only Love" from the Tejas album was eventually dropped from the main set due to technical errors.

== Reception ==
Despite the fact that the band didn't have a new album to tour with, El Camino Ocho received generally positive reviews. Many reviews did state Gibbons' voice as being "gruff" or "throaty-sounding", and compared to "road gravel". His guitar playing, however, was well received by audiences. The Toronto Sun gave a rating of 4 out of 5 for the concert on August 24, 2008.

== Post-tour ==
=== Double Down Live ===
The tour was filmed for future DVD release by Jamie Burton Chamberlin. In October 2009, Eagle Vision released Double Down Live, which combined footage from the tour, and featured 4 of the 11 songs being filmed during the tour. An interview was included in the DVD, filmed before the concert at Zénith de Paris.

== Tour dates ==
List of concerts, showing date, city, country, venue, tickets sold, number of available tickets and amount of gross revenue
Date	City	Country	Venue	Opening act(s)
Leg 1: North America
May 2, 2008	Bossier City	United States	Horseshoe Bossier City	
May 7, 2008	Tucson	United States	AVA Amphitheater	Rosie Flores
May 9, 2008	Dixon	United States	Dixon May Fair	
May 10, 2008	Valley Center	United States	Harrah's Rincon	
May 15, 2008	Austin	United States	The Backyard	Rosie Flores
May 16, 2008	Corpus Christi	United States	American Bank Center Arena	Sun Salutation
May 22, 2008	St. Augustine	United States	St. Augustine Amphitheatre	Blackberry Smoke
May 23, 2008	Orange Beach	United States	The Amphitheater at the Wharf	38 Special
May 24, 2008	Robinsonville	United States	Harrah's Casino Tunica	
May 25, 2008	Little Rock	United States	RiverFest	38 Special, Bucket of Blues
May 29, 2008	Pelham	United States	Verizon Wireless Amphitheatre	Zac Brown Band
May 30, 2008	Johnson City	United States	Freedom Hall Civic Center	Joe Diffie
May 31, 2008	Fort Knox	United States	Godman Army Airfield	Blackberry Smoke
June 3, 2008	Knoxville	United States	Tennessee Theatre	Blackberry Smoke
June 5, 2008	Marksville	United States	Paragon Casino Resort	
June 6, 2008	Enterprise	United States	BamaJam	Trace Adkins, Tracy Lawrence
June 7, 2008	Atlanta	United States	Chastain Park Amphitheatre	Zac Brown Band
June 8, 2008	North Charleston	United States	North Charleston Coliseum	Blackberry Smoke
June 12, 2008	Chattanooga	United States	Riverbend Festival	Steel Mill
June 13, 2008	Jackson	United States	Jubilee! Jam	Blind Melon, Eric Church
June 14, 2008	Valdosta	United States	Wild Adventures	Blackberry Smoke
June 17, 2008	Solomons	United States	Calvert Marine Museum	Blackberry Smoke
June 19, 2008	Gilford	United States	Meadowbrook U.S. Cellular Pavilion	Blackberry Smoke
June 20, 2008	Wallingford	United States	Chevrolet Theatre	Blackberry Smoke
June 21, 2008	Rutland	United States	Vermont State Fairgrounds	Blackberry Smoke
June 22, 2008	Aberdeen	United States	Aberdeen Proving Ground	Blackberry Smoke
Leg 2: Europe
July 4, 2008	Porto	Portugal	Parque da Cidade	Love and Rockets, David Fonseca
July 6, 2008	Bilbao	Spain	Bilbao BBK Live	Riders on the Storm, The Blues Brothers
July 7, 2008	Carcassonne	France	Théâtre Jean-Deschamps	
July 8, 2008	Lyon	France	Halle Tony Garnier	
July 10, 2008	Paris	France	Zénith de Paris	
July 11, 2008	Bonn	Germany	Museumsmeile	
July 12, 2008	Potsdam	Germany	Lustwiese	Thin Lizzy, Free
July 13, 2008	Weert	Netherlands	Bospop	Europe, Ted Nugent
July 15, 2008	Differdange	Luxembourg	Aréna du Centenaire	Lance Lopez
July 16, 2008	Singen	Germany	Hohentwielfestival	
July 18, 2008	Carhaix	France	Vieilles Charrues Festival	Christophe Maé, Yael Naim
July 20, 2008	Six-Fours-les-Plages	France	Festival Les Voix du Gaou	Steve Lukather
July 21, 2008	Monte Carlo	Monaco	Sporting Summer Festival	
Leg 3: North America
August 1, 2008	Albuquerque	United States	Journal Pavilion	Brooks & Dunn, Rodney Atkins
August 2, 2008	Phoenix	United States	Cricket Wireless Pavilion	Brooks & Dunn, Rodney Atkins
August 3, 2008	San Bernardino	United States	San Manuel Amphitheater	Brooks & Dunn, Rodney Atkins
August 5, 2008	Nampa	United States	Idaho Center Amphitheater	Steve Richard
August 7, 2008	Sturgis	United States	Buffalo Chip Campground	Sugarland
August 8, 2008	Vancouver	Canada	General Motors Place	Rodney Atkins
August 9, 2008	Auburn	United States	White River Amphitheatre	Brooks & Dunn, Rodney Atkins
August 14, 2008	Louisville	United States	Freedom Hall	Brooks & Dunn, Rodney Atkins
August 15, 2008	Springfield	United States	Illinois State Fairgrounds Grandstand	Brooks & Dunn, Heidi Newfield
August 16, 2008	Omaha	United States	Qwest Center Omaha	Brooks & Dunn, Justin Moore
August 17, 2008	Oklahoma City	United States	Ford Center	Brooks & Dunn, Rodney Atkins
August 23, 2008	Clarkston	United States	DTE Energy Music Theatre	Brooks & Dunn, Rodney Atkins
August 24, 2008	Toronto	Canada	Molson Canadian Amphitheatre	Brooks & Dunn, Rodney Atkins
August 25, 2008	Syracuse	United States	Mohegan Sun Grandstand	Brooks & Dunn, James Otto
August 26, 2008	Allentown	United States	Allentown Fairgrounds	Brooks & Dunn, James Otto
August 29, 2008	Milwaukee	United States	Henry Maier Festival Park	Gary Allan, Fisher Stevenson
August 31, 2008	Fort Leonard Wood	United States	Fort Leonard Wood	Bowling for Soup
September 5, 2008	Charlotte	United States	Verizon Wireless Amphitheatre	Rodney Atkins
September 6, 2008	Raleigh	United States	Time Warner Cable Music Pavilion	Brooks & Dunn, Rodney Atkins
September 7, 2008	Charlottesville	United States	John Paul Jones Arena	Rodney Atkins
September 9, 2008	York	United States	York Fairgrounds	
Leg 4: North America ("In Your Face")
September 26, 2008	Wichita	United States	Century II Concert Hall	Blackberry Smoke
September 27, 2008	Fort Smith	United States	Fort Smith Convention Center	Blackberry Smoke
September 28, 2008	Tulsa	United States	SpiritBank Event Center	Blackberry Smoke
September 30, 2008	St. Louis	United States	Fox Theatre	Blackberry Smoke
October 1, 2008	Kansas City	United States	Midland Theatre	Blackberry Smoke
October 3, 2008	Nashville	United States	Ryman Auditorium	Blackberry Smoke
October 4, 2008	Huntington	United States	Keith-Albee Theatre	Blackberry Smoke
October 5, 2008	Cleveland	United States	Allen Theatre	Blackberry Smoke
October 10, 2008	Columbus	United States	Palace Theatre	Blackberry Smoke
October 11, 2008	Indianapolis	United States	Murat Theatre	Blackberry Smoke
October 12, 2008	Milwaukee	United States	Riverside Theater	Blackberry Smoke
October 15, 2008	Pittsburgh	United States	Post-Gazette Pavilion	Brooks & Dunn, Rodney Atkins
October 16, 2008	Tinley Park	United States	First Midwest Bank Amphitheatre	Brooks & Dunn, Rodney Atkins
October 17, 2008	Minneapolis	United States	Orpheum Theatre	Blackberry Smoke
October 18, 2008	Grand Forks	United States	Chester Fritz Auditorium	Blackberry Smoke
October 19, 2008	Sioux Falls	United States	Washington Pavilion of Arts and Science	Blackberry Smoke
October 22, 2008	Portland	United States	Arlene Schnitzer Concert Hall	Blackberry Smoke
October 23, 2008	Pullman	United States	Beasley Coliseum	Blackberry Smoke
October 26, 2008	Pomona	United States	Fairplex	The Tubes, Georgia Satellites
October 30, 2008	Colorado Springs	United States	Pikes Peak Center	Blackberry Smoke
October 31, 2008	Denver	United States	Paramount Theatre	Blackberry Smoke
November 1, 2008	Amarillo	United States	Amarillo Civic Center Auditorium	Blackberry Smoke
