= Hollywood Blues Tour =

2007 concert tour by ZZ Top

- Tour by ZZ Top
- Location: United States; Canada
- Start date: March 12, 2007
- End date: October 27, 2007
- Legs: 3
- No. of shows: 87
- Box office: US$17,800,000

ZZ Top concert chronology
- Whack Attack Tour (2005); Hollywood Blues Tour (2007); El Camino Ocho Tour (2008)

The Hollywood Blues Tour was a concert tour through the United States and Canada, undertaken by American rock band ZZ Top. Named after a warm-up show at the House of Blues in West Hollywood, California, the tour was their second of which to be staged without a supporting album. As a result, they did not perform any newer material. Although this was a criticism for the tour, it was generally well-received—a critic from The Florida Times-Union regarded the band as "one of rock's most reliable acts; you just know they're going to put on a good show". In contrast to ZZ Top's elaborately staged productions from previous tours, the Hollywood Blues Tour utilized an austere stage setup. To embrace the group's renowned concept of visual imagery, the stage featured an LED drape for a backdrop video screen that showed visual effects, video clips and flashing text phrases, along with amplifiers stacks and a Van de Graaff generator.

Consisting of three legs and 87 shows, the tour began in Boca Raton, Florida on March 12, 2007 and ended in Miami, Oklahoma on October 27, 2007. After the first leg, the tour was expanded for a summer tour with the Stray Cats and The Pretenders, which was branded as "Summer Scorcher". With a total gross of $17.8 million, Hollywood Blues sold over 380,000 tickets at its conclusion. The band's 2008 live album and DVD Live from Texas was filmed and recorded during a show in Grand Prairie, Texas after the tour's conclusion. A portion of the tour is shown in the Eagle Rock 2009 concert film Double Down Live.

== Tour dates ==
List of concerts, showing date, city, country, venue, tickets sold, number of available tickets and amount of gross revenue
Date	City	Country	Venue	Opening act(s)	Attendance	Revenue
Leg 1: amphitheaters and arenas in North America
March 12, 2007	Boca Raton	United States	Mizner Park	Robert Fortune Band	—	—
March 13, 2007	Jacksonville	United States	Florida Theatre	Robert Fortune Band	1,918 / 1,918	—
March 14, 2007	Orange Beach	United States	The Wharf Amphitheater	Robert Fortune Band	—	—
March 17, 2007	Durant	United States	Choctaw Casino and Resort		—	—
March 18, 2007	Houston	United States	Reliant Stadium		70,014 / 71,500	—
March 23, 2007	Corpus Christi	United States	American Bank Center Arena	Robert Fortune Band	—	—
March 24, 2007	Belton	United States	Bell County Expo Center	Robert Fortune Band	—	—
March 25, 2007	Wichita Falls	United States	Kay Yeager Coliseum	Los Lonely Boys	—	—
March 30, 2007	Winchester	United States	Las Vegas Hilton	Bang Bang Bang	—	—
March 31, 2007	Winchester	United States	Las Vegas Hilton	Bang Bang Bang	—	—
April 6, 2007	Kinder	United States	Coushatta Casino Resort	Bang Bang Bang	—	—
April 7, 2007	Beaumont	United States	Ford Park Pavilion	Los Lonely Boys, Cross Canadian Ragweed	—	—
April 11, 2007	Rio Rancho	United States	Santa Ana Star Center	Bang Bang Bang	—	—
April 12, 2007	Mescalero	United States	Inn of the Mountain Gods Resort	Bang Bang Bang	—	—
April 14, 2007	Austin	United States	The Backyard	Bang Bang Bang	—	—
April 15, 2007	Austin	United States	The Backyard	Bang Bang Bang	—	—
April 18, 2007	Phoenix	United States	Dodge Theatre	Bang Bang Bang	—	—
April 20, 2007	Reno	United States	Peppermill Reno	Laidlaw	—	—
April 21, 2007	Kelseyville	United States	Konocti Harbor	Laidlaw	—	—
April 23, 2007	Alpine	United States	Viejas Casino	Laidlaw	—	—
April 24, 2007	Prescott Valley	United States	Tim's Toyota Center	Laidlaw	—	—
April 26, 2007	Santa Ynez	United States	Chumash Casino Resort	Laidlaw	—	—
April 27, 2007	Laughlin	United States	Aquarius Casino Resort	Laidlaw	—	—
April 28, 2007	Laughlin	United States	Aquarius Casino Resort	Laidlaw	—	—
April 29, 2007	Pala	United States	Pala Casino Resort and Spa	Laidlaw	—	—
May 2, 2007	St. Louis	United States	America's Center		—	—
May 4, 2007	New Orleans	United States	Fair Grounds Race Course	Luther Kent, Chuck Leavell with the Randall Bramblett Band	—	—
May 17, 2007	Pikeville	United States	Eastern Kentucky Expo Center	Blackberry Smoke	—	—
May 18, 2007	Youngstown	United States	Chevrolet Centre		—	—
May 19, 2007	Columbus	United States	Columbus Crew Stadium	Evanescence, Velvet Revolver	—	—
Leg 2: amphitheaters and arenas in North America ("Summer Scorcher")
July 14, 2007	The Woodlands	United States	Cynthia Woods Mitchell Pavilion	Hank Williams III, Old 97's	—	—
July 15, 2007	Dallas	United States	Smirnoff Music Centre	Old 97's, Shooter Jennings	—	—
July 19, 2007	Bridgeview	United States	Toyota Park	REO Speedwagon, The Pretenders	—	—
July 21, 2007	Baltimore	United States	1st Mariner Arena	REO Speedwagon, The Pretenders	—	—
July 22, 2007	Wantagh	United States	Nikon at Jones Beach Theater	The Pretenders, Stray Cats	—	—
July 23, 2007	Atlantic City	United States	Borgata Event Center	The Pretenders, Stray Cats	—	—
July 25, 2007	Sterling Heights	United States	Freedom Hill Amphitheatre	The Pretenders, Stray Cats	—	—
July 26, 2007	Noblesville	United States	Verizon Wireless Music Center	The Pretenders, Stray Cats	—	—
July 28, 2007	Saint Paul	United States	Xcel Energy Center	The Pretenders, Stray Cats	—	—
July 29, 2007	St. Louis	United States	Scottrade Center	The Pretenders, Stray Cats	—	—
July 31, 2007	Birmingham	United States	Verizon Wireless Music Center Birmingham	Blackberry Smoke	—	—
August 1, 2007	Nashville	United States	Sommet Center	The Pretenders, Stray Cats	—	—
August 3, 2007	Oklahoma City	United States	Zoo Amphitheater	The Pretenders, Stray Cats	—	—
August 4, 2007	Lubbock	United States	United Spirit Arena	Whitestarr	—	—
August 5, 2007	Selma	United States	Verizon Wireless Amphitheater	The Pretenders, Stray Cats	—	—
August 9, 2007	Sturgis	United States	Buffalo Chip Campground	Buckcherry	—	—
August 11, 2007	Las Vegas	United States	Orleans Arena	The Pretenders, Stray Cats	5,186 / 9,000	$268,652
August 13, 2007	Morrison	United States	Red Rocks Amphitheatre	The Pretenders, Stray Cats	—	—
August 15, 2007	West Valley City	United States	USANA Amphitheatre	The Pretenders, Stray Cats	—	—
August 17, 2007	Fresno	United States	Save Mart Center	The Pretenders, Stray Cats	—	—
August 18, 2007	Irvine	United States	Verizon Wireless Amphitheater	The Pretenders, Stray Cats	14,216 / 16,009	$716,966
August 19, 2007	Chula Vista	United States	Coors Amphitheatre	The Pretenders, Stray Cats	—	—
August 21, 2007	Sacramento	United States	ARCO Arena	The Pretenders, Stray Cats	—	—
August 23, 2007	Vancouver	Canada	General Motors Place	The Pretenders, Stray Cats	—	—
August 25, 2007	Puyallup	United States	Puyallup Fair	The Pretenders, Stray Cats	—	—
August 26, 2007	Ridgefield	United States	Clark County Amphitheater	The Pretenders, Stray Cats	—	—
August 31, 2007	Hidalgo	United States	Dodge Arena		—	—
September 6, 2007	Southaven	United States	Snowden Grove Amphitheater	American Bang	6,103 / 11,000	—
September 7, 2007	Atlanta	United States	Chastain Park Amphitheater	Blackberry Smoke	—	—
September 9, 2007	Toledo	United States	SeaGate Convention Centre	Chris Duarte Group	—	—
September 11, 2007	Merrillville	United States	Star Plaza Theatre	Blackberry Smoke	—	—
September 12, 2007	South Bend	United States	Morris Performing Arts Center	Blackberry Smoke	—	—
September 14, 2007	Council Bluffs	United States	Mid-America Center	Blackberry Smoke	—	—
September 16, 2007	Peoria	United States	Peoria Civic Center	Blackberry Smoke	—	—
September 19, 2007	Niagara Falls	United States	Seneca Niagara Casino & Hotel		—	—
September 20, 2007	Verona	United States	Turning Stone Resort Casino	Blackberry Smoke	—	—
September 21, 2007	Uncasville	United States	Mohegan Sun Arena	Blackberry Smoke	—	—
September 22, 2007	Gilford	United States	Meadowbrook U.S. Cellular Pavilion	Blackberry Smoke	—	—
September 25, 2007	Bangor	United States	Bangor Auditorium	Blackberry Smoke	—	—
September 27, 2007	New York City	United States	Beacon Theatre	Blackberry Smoke	—	—
September 28, 2007	New York City	United States	Beacon Theatre	Blackberry Smoke	—	—
September 29, 2007	Boston	United States	Bank of America Pavilion	Blackberry Smoke	—	—
Leg 3: arenas and auditoriums in the United States
October 5, 2007	Fayetteville	United States	Randal Tyson Track Center	Blackberry Smoke	—	—
October 7, 2007	Knoxville	United States	Tennessee Theatre	Blackberry Smoke	—	—
October 10, 2007	Orlando	United States	Hard Rock Live Orlando	Blackberry Smoke	—	—
October 12, 2007	Huntington	United States	Big Sandy Superstore Arena	Blackberry Smoke	—	—
October 13, 2007	Evansville	United States	Roberts Stadium	Travis Tritt	—	—
October 14, 2007	Dayton	United States	Ervin J. Nutter Center	Travis Tritt	—	—
October 17, 2007	Fort Wayne	United States	Embassy Theatre	Sulentic Brothers Band	—	—
October 19, 2007	Harris	United States	Island Resort & Casino		—	—
October 20, 2007	Harris	United States	Island Resort & Casino		—	—
October 21, 2007	East Lansing	United States	Wharton Center for Performing Arts	Blackberry Smoke	—	—
October 23, 2007	Dubuque	United States	Five Flags Center	Blackberry Smoke	—	—
October 25, 2007	Thackerville	United States	WinStar World Casino		—	—
October 26, 2007	Norman	United States	Riverwind Casino		—	—
October 27, 2007	Miami	United States	Buffalo Run Casino & Resort	Blackberry Smoke	—	—
