= She's Just Killing Me =

Single by ZZ Top

from the album Rhythmeen
- B-side: "Dengue Woman Blues"
- Released: 1996
- Recorded: 1995
- Genre: Hard rock
- Length: 4:55
- Label: RCA
- Songwriters: Billy Gibbons; Dusty Hill; Frank Beard
- Producer: Bill Ham

ZZ Top singles chronology
"Fuzzbox Voodoo" (1994)	"She's Just Killing Me" (1996)	"What's Up with That" (1996)

"She's Just Killing Me" is a song by rock band ZZ Top, released as the first single from their 1996 album, Rhythmeen.

The single was promoting the film From Dusk till Dawn where it was featured as well as on its soundtrack, which also includes "Mexican Blackbird" from the 1975 album Fandango!.

== Track listing ==
1. "She's Just Killing Me"
2. "Dengue Woman Blues" (written and performed by Jimmie Vaughan)

== Music video ==
The music video shows ZZ Top playing in a bar then cuts to video clips from the film From Dusk till Dawn featuring George Clooney and Salma Hayek.

== Personnel ==
- Billy Gibbons – guitar, lead vocals
- Dusty Hill – bass, backing vocals
- Frank Beard – drums
