= What's Up with That (ZZ Top song) =

Single by ZZ Top

from the album Rhythmeen
- Released: September 3, 1996
- Recorded: 1996
- Genre: Blues rock
- Length: 5:19
- Label: RCA
- Songwriters: Billy Gibbons; Joe Hardy; Luther Ingram; Mack Rice
- Producer: Bill Ham

ZZ Top singles chronology
"She's Just Killing Me" (1996)	"What's Up with That" (1996)	"Fearless Boogie" (1999)

"What's Up with That" is a song by ZZ Top, released as the second single from their 1996 album Rhythmeen.

== Overview ==
The song is a deliberate return to ZZ Top's blues roots, dropping the synthesizers and back to the guitar.

The single features two previously unreleased live recordings that were captured "live and sly during one of the many ZZ Top late nights". The first live song is a cover version of "Stop Breaking Down Blues" by the blues musician Robert Johnson; that song was only played live during the 1996 Continental Safari Tour. The second live song is "Nasty Dogs and Funky Kings", originally from their 1975 album Fandango!. Although released in America in September 1996, it had entered the UK charts in June, when the band were also featured on the BBC's Later... with Jools Holland TV show.

== Track listing ==
No.	Title	Length
1.	"What's Up with That" (radio version)	3:35
2.	"What's Up with That" (original version)	5:19
3.	"Stop Breaking Down Blues" (live)	4:03
4.	"Nasty Dogs and Funky Kings" (live)	3:48

== Personnel ==
- Billy Gibbons – guitar, lead vocals
- Dusty Hill – bass guitar, backing vocals
- Frank Beard – drums

=== Additional personnel ===
- James Harman – harmonica

== Charts ==
=== Weekly charts ===
Chart (1996)	Peak position
Canada Top Singles (RPM)	7
Finland (Suomen virallinen lista)	8
Scottish Singles Sales (Official Charts)	90
UK Singles (Official Charts)	58
UK Rock & Metal (Official Charts)	3
US Mainstream Rock (Billboard)	5

=== Year-end charts ===
Chart (1996)	Position
Canada Top Singles (RPM)	88
US Mainstream Rock Tracks (Billboard)	55
