= Steve Richard =

American singer-songwriter

Steve Richard, (born 1972 in Providence, Rhode Island, living in St. Louis, Missouri) is an American Christian Country music singer. He is on the Force MP Entertainment record label.

His Goodwill Radio Tour raised funds for local and national charities, including Toys For Tots, the National Cancer Society and the Salvation Army.

Richard released album "Steve Richard" in 2008 and "Up to Somethin'" in 2009, produced by Phil O'Donnell and recorded at Reba McEntire's Starstruck Studios and at Nashville's Legends Studio.

For the first album Richard moved to Nashville, TN and worked with producer/musician John Rich, producer Michael Bradford (Kid Rock, and Uncle Kracker) with whom he wrote seven of the songs. The single "Stomp" was used for a line dance and became an interactive video game, while his "Bridge Back Home" was used by the National Wrestling Alliance.

As of 2012 Richard lived in St. Louis, Missouri, with his wife, Rachelle and daughter Marion (born 2007).

== Discography ==
=== Albums ===
- 2008 – Steve Richard / Produced by Michael Bradford, John Rich
- 2010 - Up To Somethin' / Produced by Phil O'Donnell
- 2014 - Keep On Rollin / Produced by Phil O'Donnell

=== Singles ===
- "The Rock On Which I Stand" Duet with Laura Dodd (2013) – Reached No. 1 on the Power Source chart in 2013
- "I See You In Everything" Duet with Laura Dodd (2013) – Reached No. 1 on the Power Source chart in 2013
- "Toothbrush" (2012) – Reached No. 1 on the Power Source chart in 2012
- "Love's Gotta Go Somewhere" (2011)
- "Eighty Acre Church" (2010–2011) – Reached No. 1 on the Power Source chart in December 2010
- "Invisible Hand" (2010–2011)
- "Make It Into Heaven" (2009–2010)

Reached No. 3 on the Power Source chart, July 2009
Nominated for Song of the Year at the 2009 Inspirational Country Music Awards

- "Never Leave You Behind," (2009) Reached Top 15 on the Powersource Christian Country Chart
- "Stomp" (2009)

== Awards ==
- 15th Annual Inspirational Country Music Awards "New Artist of the Year"
- 15th Annual Inspirational Country Music Awards "Song of the Year" Nomination for "Make It Into Heaven"
- 16th Annual Inspirational Country Music Awards Final Round Nominee for Christian Country Song of the Year, "Eighty Acre Church"
- 16th Annual Inspirational Country Music Awards Final Round Nominee for the Entertainer of the Year
- 18th Annual Inspirational Country Music Awards Winner for the Video of Year for "Love's Gotta Go Somewhere"
- 18th Annual Inspirational Country Music Awards Final Round Nominee for the Video of the Year for "Toothbrush"
- 19th Annual Inspirational Country Music Awards Final Round Nominee for the Video of the Year for "Keep On Rollin'"
- 19th Annual Inspirational Country Music Awards Vocal Duo of the Year Winner with Laura Dodd for "I See You In Everything"

== Music videos ==
- "Toothbrush" (2014)
- "Eight Acre Church, FFA Remix" (2010)
- "Eighty Acre Church" (2010)
- "Invisible Hand" (2010)
- "Stomp" (2009)
