= Country Jam USA =

Music festival in Eau Claire, Wisconsin, US

- Genre: Country
- Dates: July 18–20, 2023
- Location: Eau Claire, Wisconsin
- Years active: 1990-present
- Founded: 1989
- Website: http://countryjamwi.com/

Country Jam USA is a 3-day annual country music festival held in Eau Claire, Wisconsin. The 2024 lineup includes Thomas Rhett, HARDY, Owen Hernandez, Brothers Osborne and more. The first festival was held in 1990, making Country Jam USA one of the longest-running festivals in the country.

== History ==
Country Jam USA was founded in Eau Claire, Wisconsin in 1989. The first Country Jam festival took place in 1990 and was held in Eau Claire, Wisconsin.

Country Jam USA's previous lineups have included Keith Urban, Eric Church, Blake Shelton, Lady Antebellum, Dirks Bentley, Kenny Chesney, Jake Owen, Florida Georgia Line, Billy Currington, Sugarland, Willie Nelson, Alan Jackson, Tim McGraw, Faith Hill, Clint Black and Gary Allen.

== Location ==
The Country Jam USA festival site is located between the lush forests of west-central Wisconsin and the meandering Chippewa River. Country Jam USA appreciates the natural scenery and offers camping for festival-goers under the secluded pine trees in the area or in the lush fields nearby.

== Awards and honors ==
- 1995: nominee for Special Event of the Year, Country Music Association
- 2015: Community Development Award from the Eau Claire Chamber of Commerce

== Lineups by year ==
2008
- Carrie Underwood
- Big & Rich
- Rascal Flatts
- Clay Walker
- Little Big Town
- Taylor Swift
- Joe Nichols
- Pat Green
- Tracy Lawrence
- Lady Antebellum
- Eric Church
- LoCash Cowboys
- Sarah Jones
- Ashton Shepherd
2009
- Tim McGraw
- 38 Special
- Gary Allan
- Blake Shelton
- Phil Vassar
- Sawyer Brown
- Diamond Rio
- Jamey Johnson
- Heidi Newfield
- Chris Cagle
- LoCash Cowboys
- Jack Ingram
- Neal McCoy
2010
- Keith Urban
- Alan Jackson
- Trace Adkins
- Billy Currington
- Big Kenny
- Miranda Lambert
- LeeAnn Womack
- Sawyer Brown
- Danny Gokey
- Jake Owen
- Williams & Ree
- Gloriana
- David Nail
- LoCash Cowboys
- Stealing Angels
- Sarah Darling
- Marshall Reign
- Glen Templeton
- Texas Flood
2011
- Blake Shelton
- Martina McBride
- Zac Brown Band
- Josh Kelley
- Easton Corbin
- Rocket Club
- The JaneDear Girls
- Joe Diffie
- Little Big Town
- Due West
- Jason Jones
- David Nail
- LoCash Cowboys
2012
- Trace Adkins
- Montgomery Gentry
- Jason Aldean
- Chris Young
- Craig Morgan
- Luke Bryan
- The McClymonts
- Edens Edge
- Jake Owen
- Thomas Rhett
- LoCash Cowboys
- Lauren Alaina
- Jana Kramer
- Jerrod Niemann
- Justin Moore
- Tim Sigler
2013
- Rascal Flatts
- Kid Rock
- Miranda Lambert
- Montgomery Gentry
- Sawyer Brown
- Uncle Kracker
- Gary Allan
- Lee Brice
- Blackhawk
- Randy Houser
- Florida Georgia Line
- Locash Cowboys
- Western Underground
- Chase Rice
- Dustin Lynch
- Parmalee
- Dakota Bradley
- Charlie Worsham
- Charley Jenkins
- Open Range
2014
- Jake Owen
- Dierks Bentley
- Luke Bryan
- The Band Perry
- Jennifer Nettles
- Chris Young
- Thomas Rhett
- LoCash Cowboys
- Lee Brice
- Cassadee Pope
- Chase Rice
- Dustin Lynch
- Chris Janson
- Dallas Smith
- Parmalee
- Sasha McVeigh
2015
- Blake Shelton
- Lady Antebellum
- Eric Church
- Cassadee Pope
- Gary Allan
- Kip Moore
- Hunter Hayes
- Jerrod Niemann
- Ashley Monroe
- Sam Hunt
- Granger Smith
- LoCash Cowboys
- Elizabeth Lyons
- Cassadee Pope
- Sasha McVeigh
2016
- Jason Aldean
- Florida Georgia Line
- Jake Owen
- The Band Perry
- Thomas Rhett
- Cole Swindell
- Eli Young Band
- LoCash
- Colt Ford
- A Thousand Horses
- Brothers Osborne
- The Cadillac Three
- Clare Dunn
- Jackson Michelson
- Robbie Johnson
2017
- Luke Bryan
- Miranda Lambert
- Dierks Bentley
- Cole Swindell
- Brett Eldredge
- Gary Allan
- Locash
- Trace Adkins
- Old Dominion
- Kane Brown
- High Valley
- Jana Kramer
- Carly Pearce
- Tim Sigler
- Cody Johnson
- Sasha McVeigh
2018
- Blake Shelton
- Billy Currington
- Alabama
- Justin Moore
- Dustin Lynch
- Clay Walker
- Craig Morgan
- LOCASH
- Tracy Lawrence
- Jerrod Niemann
- Granger Smith
- Sammy Kershaw
- Collin Raye
- Aaron Tippin
- Aaron Watson
- Maggie Rose
- Lorrie Morgan
- Farewell Angelina
- Jobe Fortner
- Jackson Michelson

== See also ==
- Country Jam Ranch
