= Sasha McVeigh =

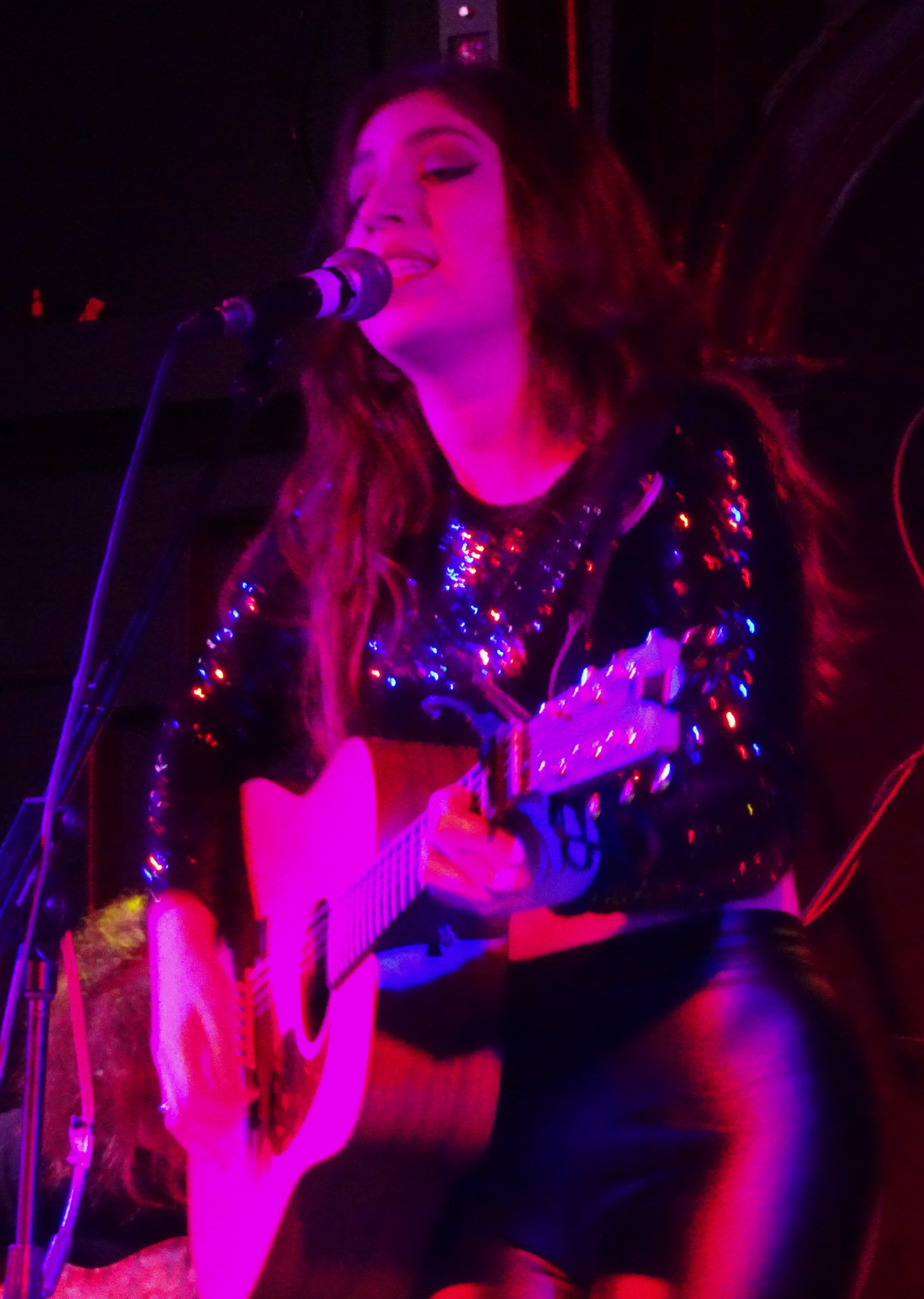
- Sasha McVeigh performing live in March 2016

Background information
- Born: 17 March 1994 (age 32); Hereford, United Kingdom
- Genres: Country
- Occupation: Singer • songwriter
- Instruments: Vocals, guitar, keyboard
- Years active: 2012–present
- Website: www.sashamcveigh.com

Sasha McVeigh is a British country music singer-songwriter from Hereford, United Kingdom. Upon completing high school in 2012, she began pursuing a career in the country industry. In 2017, McVeigh moved to Nashville, Tennessee after obtaining her green card. She became a naturalised citizen in 2023.

== Music career ==
McVeigh began performing professionally in July 2012 after graduating Hereford Sixth Form College. She graduated with four A-levels and five university offers, but instead chose to go to Nashville and pursue a career in country music.

McVeigh has played on the main stage at numerous festivals in the UK and USA, and named UK Country Radio Awards "Female Vocalist of the Year" in 2015. She has embarked on co-headline tours with American artists Sonia Leigh and American Young in the UK, as well as embarking on her own headline tours and opening for acts such as Dustin Lynch, Luke Bryan and Keith Urban in the US.

In 2016, McVeigh released a her single When I'm Over You, which had been recorded in Nashville in November 2015. The song was debuted by Bob Harris on his BBC Radio 2 show and was added to the Wild Country Playlist on Spotify, subsequently amassing over 500,000 streams in the first three weeks. The video premiered on the boot in July 2016.

== Discography ==
- "Sasha McVeigh" – EP (2013)
- I Stand Alone – Album (2015)
- "When I'm Over You" – Single (2016)
- "Rock Bottom" – Single (2019)
- "God Bless This Mess" – Single (2021)
- "Hide & Seek" – Single (2021)
- "Fine Line" – Single (2022)
- "Mama (Linda's Song)" – Single (2022)
