= XXX (ZZ Top album) =

Studio album (with live elements) by ZZ Top
- Released: September 28, 1999
- Recorded: April 1998 – June 1999
- Length: 49:31
- Label: RCA
- Producer: Billy Gibbons

ZZ Top chronology
Rhythmeen (1996)	XXX (1999)	Mescalero (2003)

XXX is the thirteenth studio album (also including live material) by the American rock band ZZ Top, released in September 1999. The album's title commemorates the band's 30th anniversary.

== Reception ==
Professional ratings
Review scores
Source	Rating
AllMusic	1.5/5 stars
The Austin Chronicle	2/5 stars
Robert Christgau	(2-star Honorable Mention)
Rolling Stone	3/5 stars
The Rolling Stone Album Guide	1.5/5 stars

AllMusic gave the album only one and a half star, and in its review by Stephen Thomas Erlewine, he states: "After all, countless blues-based musicians, from Lightnin' Hopkins and Muddy Waters to B.B. King and the Rolling Stones, have aged gracefully, albeit in varying degrees. So why does ZZ Top sound so stiff and useless on XXX, a record celebrating their 30th anniversary? Part of that could be that the songwriting is decidedly weak, but a band as seasoned as ZZ Top should be able to make third-rate material at least listenable."

A more positive review was posted by RoughEdge.com, whose reviewer R. Scott Bolton gave it three out of four guitars and stated that the album "represents the best of both worlds of ZZ Top [...] [t]he bluesy sounds that highlight their early years [and] the special effects and tricks that made their later recordings so popular".

The album peaked at number 100 on the Billboard 200.

== Track listing ==
All tracks are written by Billy Gibbons, Dusty Hill and Frank Beard, except where noted.

No.	Title	Writer(s)	Length
1.	"Poke Chop Sandwich"		4:50
2.	"Crucifixx-A-Flatt"		3:59
3.	"Fearless Boogie"		4:01
4.	"36-22-36"		2:36
5.	"Made into a Movie"		5:13
6.	"Beatbox"		2:48
7.	"Trippin'"		3:55
8.	"Dreadmonboogaloo"		2:36
9.	"Live Intro by Ross Mitchell"		0:35
10.	"Sinpusher" (Live)		5:18
11.	"(Let Me Be Your) Teddy Bear" (Live)	Bernie Lowe, Kal Mann	5:21
12.	"Hey Mr. Millionaire" (Live)		4:14
13.	"Belt Buckle" (Live)		4:05
Total length:			49:31

=== Additional studio track on the Japanese edition ===
All tracks are written by Billy Gibbons, Dusty Hill, and Frank Beard, except where noted.

No.	Title	Length
9.	"Ninja Shack"	5:00

== Personnel ==
=== ZZ Top ===
- Billy Gibbons – guitar, vocals
- Dusty Hill – bass, keyboards, backing vocals, lead vocal on "(Let Me Be) Your Teddy Bear"
- Frank Beard – drums, percussion

=== Additional personnel ===
- Jeff Beck – guitar on "Hey Mr. Millionaire"
- Ross Mitchell - spoken vocals on "Introduction by Ross Mitchell"

== Production ==
- Producer: Billy Gibbons
- Engineer: Joe Hardy
- Assistant engineer: Gary Moon
- Mixing: Joe Hardy
- Mastering: Bob Ludwig
- Digital editing: Brad Blackwood
- Recording: Joe Hardy
- Art direction: Bill Narum

== Charts ==
Album – Billboard

Chart (1999)	Peak position
The Billboard 200	100

Singles – Billboard

Year	Single	Chart	Position
1999	"Fearless Boogie"	Mainstream Rock Tracks	13
2000	"36-22-36"	Mainstream Rock Tracks	31
