= Mocking Shadows =

Canadian R&B fusion band

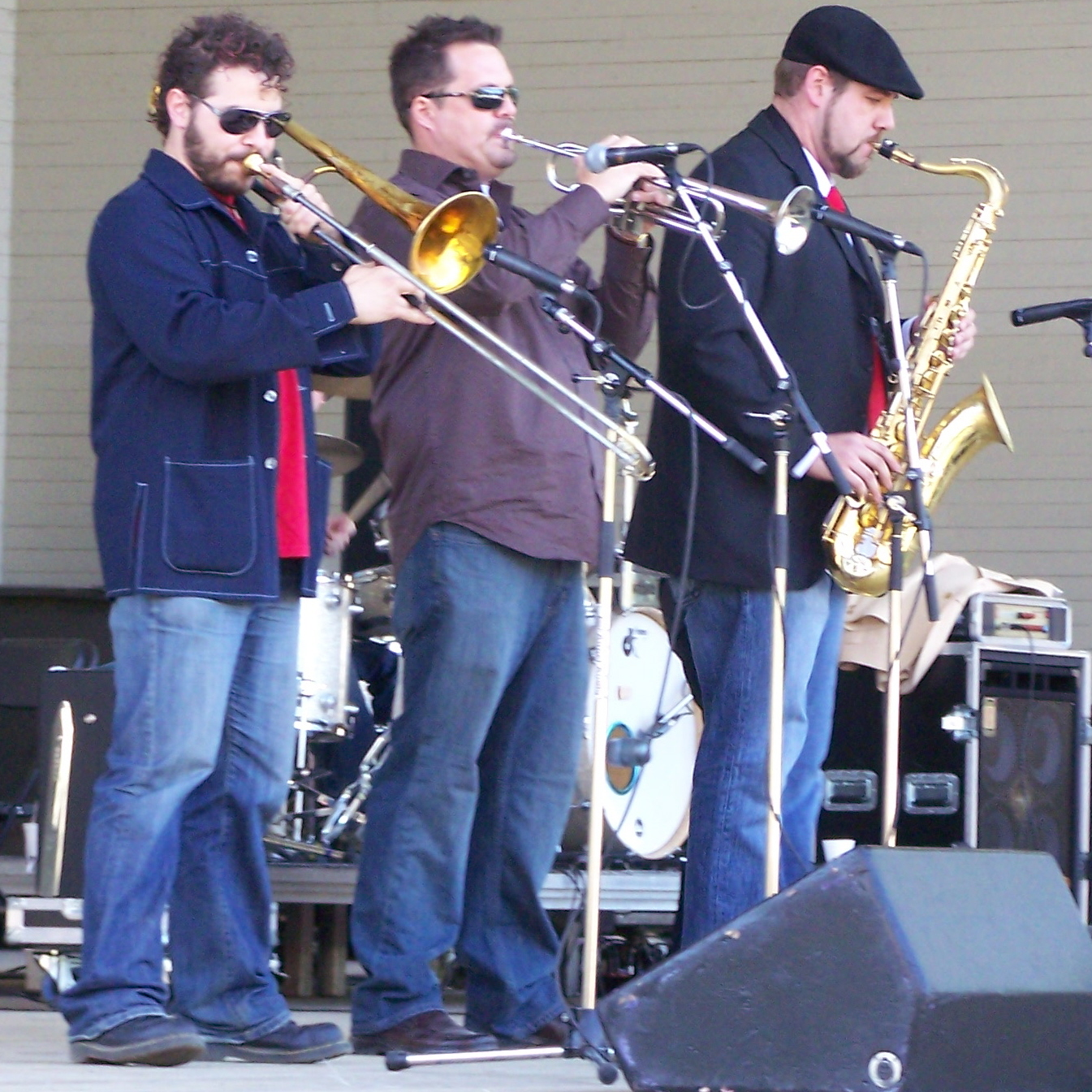
- The Mocking Shadows performing at a free concert on Canada Day 2007 in Calgary

Background information
- Origin: Calgary, Alberta, Canada
- Genres: R&B, Soul, Funk, Reggae
- Years active: 1997–present
- Members: Gareth Hughes; Andrew Lattoni; Fred Brenton; Jory Kinjo; Dan Smith; Darren Bourne

Mocking Shadows is a Canadian R&B and jazz/funk fusion band from Calgary, Alberta.

== History ==
Mocking Shadows was founded in 1997, and originally performed traditional rhythm and blues music. The band's first album was entitled Mock1, and this was followed in 1999 with a live album, Caught in the Act, and "Long Way," in 2001. In 2001 and 2002, the Mocking Shadows toured across Canada with B. B King.

The lineup changed over time, leading to the introduction of funk elements and ska jazz in their music.

The band released several more albums; their album Out of the Blue was nominated for a Western Canadian Music Award in 2004. The Shadows horn section also contributed to Boogie Patrol's 2017 album Man On Fire.

== Band members ==
=== 2023 lineup ===
- Jory Kinjo, Bass/Vocals.
- Gareth Hughes, Saxophone/Vocals.
- Steve Fletcher, Keys/Vocals.
- Freddy B, Drums.
- Aaron Young, Guitar.
- Kim Beachum, Trumpet/Flugelhorn.
- Carsten Rubeling, Trombone
- Amber Suchy, Vocals
- Stephanie Suchy, Vocals

=== Past members ===
- Adam Esposito, Drums.
- Fernando Longhi, Drums.
- Rob Phillips, Guitar/Vocals.
- Mike Little, Keys/B3.
- Darren Bourne, Keys/B3
- Andrew Lattoni, Trombone.
- Roderick Tate, Trombone.
- Ian Hartley, Trumpet/Backing Vocals
- John Johnston(deceased)Bass.
- Patrick Raymaker, Keyboards.
- Dan Smith, Guitar

== Discography ==
- Mock - 1 - 1998
- Long Way - 2001
- Caught in the Act - 1999
- Out of the Blue - 2003
- Check One - 2005
- The Sound - 2007
