= Rhythmeen =

Studio album by ZZ Top
- Released: September 17, 1996
- Recorded: February–June 1996
- Genres: Blues; blues rock
- Length: 53:55
- Label: RCA
- Producers: Billy Gibbons; Bill Ham

ZZ Top chronology
One Foot in the Blues (1994)	Rhythmeen (1996)	XXX (1999)

Singles from Rhythmeen
- 1. "She's Just Killing Me" Released: 1996; 2. "What's Up with That" Released: 1996

Rhythmeen is the twelfth studio album by the American rock band ZZ Top, released in 1996. It is their last album with longtime producer Bill Ham.

== Production and recording ==
Billy recalls "Rick Rubin has turned me on to one of his acts called Barkmarket and that the guitar player uses C# and B tunings so we began experimenting with really low tunings." Around the Rhythmeen era Billy's collection of African artifacts began and several tracks include African tribal percussion.

This is when Billy began to sport the Nudu Hat, woven by the Bamileke tribe in Cameroon, Africa.

Gibbons uses a 1955 Les Paul Goldtop guitar which is featured prominently throughout the album.

"We originally had a working title of 'Nearing the Completion Stage'. But, it was the backbeat, that mean groove, which hit us as a strong recurring element of the album. So, we did our customary play on words, shuffling words about until we came up with our own invention—a feel-good elixir named Rhythmeen."

== Reception ==
Professional ratings
Review scores
Source	Rating
AllMusic	2.5/5 stars
NME	4/10
Rolling Stone	3/5 stars
The Rolling Stone Album Guide	3.5/5 stars
Sputnikmusic	3.5/5 stars

AllMusic gave it a mixed review, stating, "ZZ Top's long-awaited return to blues finally arrived in 1996, well over a decade after they abandoned their simple three-chord boogie for a synth and drum machine-driven three-chord boogie."

The album peaked at number 29 on the Billboard 200 and at number 32 on the UK Albums Chart.

== Track listing ==
No.	Title	Writer(s)	Length
1.	"Rhythmeen"	Billy Gibbons	3:53
2.	"Bang Bang"	Gibbons	4:28
3.	"Black Fly"	Gibbons	3:31
4.	"What's Up with That"	Gibbons, Joe Hardy, Luther Ingram, Mack Rice	5:19
5.	"Vincent Price Blues"	Gibbons, Dusty Hill, Frank Beard	6:04
6.	"Zipper Job"	Gibbons, Hill, Beard	4:14
7.	"Hairdresser"	Gibbons, Hardy	3:48
8.	"She's Just Killing Me"	Gibbons, Hill, Beard	4:55
9.	"My Mind Is Gone"	Gibbons, Hardy, Gary Moon, Stevie Wonder	4:06
10.	"Loaded"	Gibbons, Hardy	3:47
11.	"Prettyhead"	Gibbons, Hill, Beard	4:37
12.	"Hummbucking, Pt. 2"	Gibbons, Hill, Beard	5:13
Total length:			53:55

Bonus track [Japan]

No.	Title	Writer(s)	Length
13.	"Isn't Love Amazing"	Gibbons	5:15
Total length:			59:10

== Personnel ==
- Billy Gibbons – guitar, lead vocals
- Dusty Hill – bass, keyboards, backing vocals, lead vocals (10)
- Frank Beard – drums, percussion
- James Harman – harmonica (4)
- Greg Morrow – percussion, drums (credited as 'Gangzz Clangzz & Percussion Thangzz') on "She's Just Killing Me" and other tracks

== Production ==
- Producers – Billy Gibbons, Bill Ham
- Engineer – Joe Hardy
- Assistant engineers – Lizzie Harrah, Gary Moon
- Mixing – Joe Hardy
- Mastering – Bob Ludwig
- Director – Douglas Biro
- Art direction – Sean Mosher-Smith
- Design – Billy Gibbons, Sean Mosher-Smith
- Photography – James Bland
- Studio – John Moran's House of Funk aka Digital Services Recording

== Charts ==
Album – Billboard (United States)

Year	Chart	Position
1996	The Billboard 200	29

Singles – Billboard (United States)

Year	Single	Chart	Position
1996	"Bang Bang"	Mainstream Rock Tracks	22
1996	"She's Just Killing Me"	Mainstream Rock Tracks	12
1996	"What's Up with That"	Mainstream Rock Tracks	5
1997	"Rhythmeen"	Mainstream Rock Tracks	35
