= Country Jam (Colorado) =

Music festival in Colorado, United States

Coordinates: 39.21459°N 108.85653°W

Country Jam was an annual music festival in the Western Slope of Colorado, United States, which started in 1992. It has been "temporarily" paused for 2026. It is/was the largest country music and camping festival in the state.

Country Jam was a three-day (previously four) "rain or shine" event. In 2024 there were no Thursday performances due to perceived lightning risk. The festival is held at the Country Jam Ranch, a 240-acre (0.97 km^{2}) ranch and music festival concert venue located near Loma, Colorado, 21 miles northwest of Grand Junction. Many attendees stay in the festival's campground area.

The festival is estimated to have an $11 million annual impact on the local economy, according to a study by Colorado Mesa University

Country Jam previous lineups have included some of the biggest names in country music.

In the 2017 festival, Old Dominion debuted three new songs, reported Taste of Country, which also said few artists "do a sing-along like Old Dominion. "Said Nobody," "Beer Can in a Truck Bed" and their version of Sam Hunt's "Make You Miss Me" (co-written by Ramsey) filled the Grand Valley as the sun went from yellow to a deep orange."

The 2019 festival featured Alabama and others.

== See also ==
- Country Jam USA, in Wisconsin
