= Konocti Harbor =

Resort and former music venue in Kelseyville, California

Coordinates: 38°59′20″N 122°44′28″W

Konocti Harbor is a resort and former music venue in Kelseyville, California. It is situated at the base of Mount Konocti on the south shore of Clear Lake, the largest freshwater lake interior to California. Its amenities include a spa, a restaurant, a marina, and two Olympic-size swimming pools.

== History ==
The resort was founded in 1959 by Joseph Mazzola, president of United Association Local 38, a union of Northern California plumbers. The intention behind the formation of the resort was to provide low-cost vacation housing for union members.

In 1982, a federal judge took control of the pension fund of the union, which owned Konocti Harbor, over allegations of financial improprieties involving the resort; in 2004, the U.S. Department of Labor again sued the union, alleging that $36 million of pension funds had been improperly diverted to the resort. Mazzola died in 1989 in a car crash near the resort, but the Mazzola family continues to own much of the land surrounding the resort.

=== Renovation ===
In 1990, Greg Bennett was hired as the general manager of Konocti Harbor. He renovated the resort and turned it into a concert venue. Bennett eventually expanded his concert hall, the Joe Mazzola Showroom, from 350 seats to 1000; Performance Magazine called it "the best small concert venue in the country". As the resort's concert business expanded, Bennett also added outdoor concerts in a 5000-seat converted softball field.

=== Closure ===
In 2007, The US Department of Labor's 2004 suit against the owners of Konocti Harbor Resort & Spa was settled. During the suit, a sale of Konocti to Page Mill Properties of Palo Alto was under way. Within that settlement Secretary of Labor Elaine L. Chao went on to state "Workers’ retirement dreams, health and other benefits were jeopardized by the gross mismanagement of their benefit plans," and "This legal action puts the benefit plans under new, independent management and restores at least $3.5 million to the pension plan." Chao's Friday statement alleged that the suit's defendants “maintained inadequate financial controls, violated plan documents, engaged in self-dealing, and imprudently spent millions to build and maintain facilities at Konocti despite the resort’s continuing financial losses.

The settlement appointed independent fiduciaries to manage the pension funds, replaces all but two trustees – Mazzola Jr. and Buckley Jr., who were required to attend training on ERISA fiduciary responsibilities – and permanently barred the replaced trustees and the former plan administrator from serving as fiduciaries or service providers for pension plans. The court also appointed WhiteStar Advisors LLC as a second fiduciary to oversee the management and operation of Konocti Harbor, as well as the pending sale to Page Mill Properties (which later fell through). After multiple failed attempts to sell the property, Larry Mazzola attempted to gain approval to convert Konocti into a gaming casino, but Lake County supervisors denied the request. In late 2009 WhiteStar Advisors, the management company that had been hired by the court, announced that Konocti Harbor would be shut down "temporarily but indefinitely". The closure seriously damaged the local tourist economy, already hard-hit by the global economic downturn.

=== Sale and reopening ===
On September 5, 2013 it was reported by a local newspaper that a sale of Konocti Harbor Resort and Spa was in the works by Resort Equities. The company plans to reopen the resort and make significant upgrades, including a "small waterside bar and grill at the northern terminus of the promenade, improving the functionality of the clubhouse with a port cochere and arrival court as well as creating new indoor/outdoor public spaces at the lakeside, expanding the number of concert parking spaces located onsite, and concentrating them in closer proximity to the amphitheater, relocating the boat yard building for repair and storage of watercraft away from the shoreline to a less strategic location on the property, improving the amphitheater facility with structural repairs where needed, new concession stands and landscaping, bringing the existing resort buildings into compliance with current ADA, life safety, seismic resistance and energy conservation codes, upgrading the landscaping, fountains, entrance gates and other site improvements (driveways, sidewalks, curbs, retaining walls, lighting and signage) to contemporary standards and creating a small vineyard and wine tasting pavilion on the site of an existing parking lot." In May 2014, it was announced that the group which was attempting to purchase the resort had failed to obtain the necessary financing.

Konocti Harbor Resort sold on Wednesday March 21, 2018 to Clear Lake Resort Services LLC, held by the Saberi family, which owns transportation and petroleum businesses in the San Francisco Bay Area. The resort held a soft-opening in April 2023, with an operational 124-room hotel, marina and Andy's Tavern restaurant, but no immediate plans to reopen the outdoor amphitheater. The resort closed for the cold season and reopened for business on May 1, 2024.
