= Leona Lewis discography =

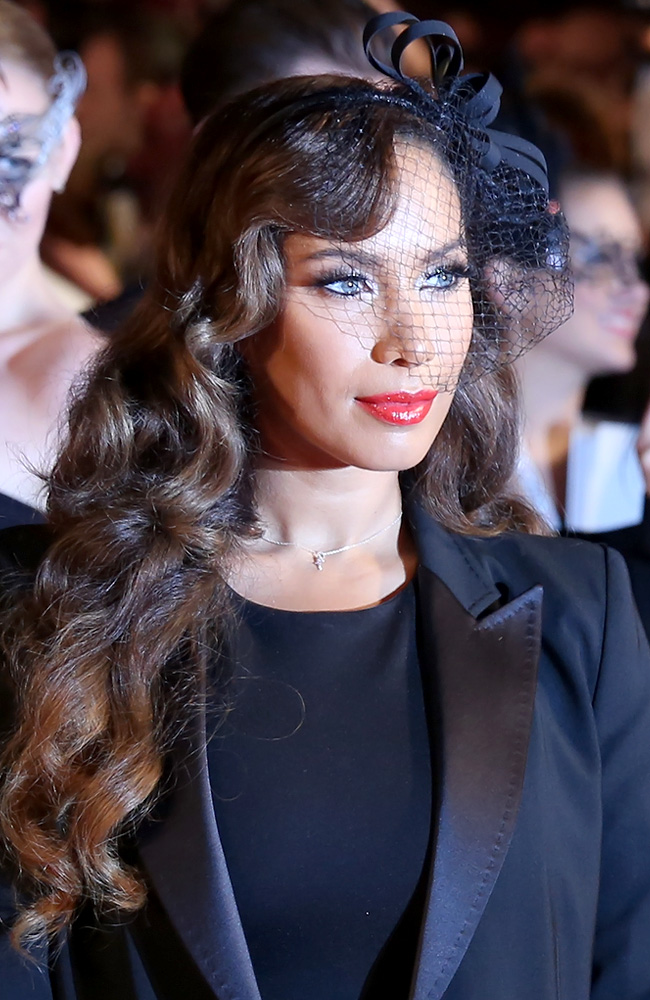
- Leona Lewis in 2014
- Studio albums: 5
- Extended plays: 1
- Live albums: 1
- Singles: 28
- Video albums: 1
- Music videos: 26

English singer Leona Lewis has released five studio albums, twenty-eight singles, one live video album, one extended play and twenty-six music videos. After winning the third series of British television talent show, The X Factor in 2006, Lewis released "A Moment Like This" in the United Kingdom and Ireland, which became the fastest selling single ever by a female artist in the UK. Her follow-up single, "Bleeding Love" reached number one in 35 countries, and was the biggest-selling single of 2008 worldwide. It remained number 1 in the UK for 7 weeks. The song has had over two billion streams. Lewis's first studio album, Spirit was released to follow the single; it became the fastest-selling debut album of all time in the UK and Ireland, and the first debut album by a British solo artist to debut at number one on the Billboard 200. As of April 2012, Spirit is the 20th biggest-selling album of all time in the UK. The next single, "Better in Time", was also successful worldwide, reaching the top ten in many countries. Subsequent singles "Forgive Me" and "Run" were released across Europe and Australia; "Forgive Me" went on to moderate success, while "Run" became Lewis's third number one in the UK, and also reached the top spot in Austria and Ireland. "I Will Be" was released as the final single in North America.

Her second studio album, Echo was released in November 2009, spawning two singles. Lead single "Happy" reached the top five in various countries in Europe, and "I Got You" was a released as the second single. She recorded the theme song, "I See You", for the 2009 film Avatar, then in 2010 featured on the soundtracks of Sex and the City 2 and For Colored Girls. In November 2010 Lewis released a video album of her tour The Labyrinth, entitled The Labyrinth Tour Live from The O2. Lewis's third album, Glassheart, was released in October 2012. "Collide" was planned as the lead single for the album, but did not make the final track listing; "Trouble" was released as the lead single instead, and "Lovebird" was released subsequently.

On 4 July 2013, Lewis confirmed that her fourth album would consist of Christmas songs, citing Motown as the album's musical direction and confirmed there would be a bit of "original material". Lewis announced that Christmas, with Love would be released on 2 December 2013 in the UK and the next day in the North America, preceded by the lead single, "One More Sleep". The song reached number three on the UK Singles Chart, giving Lewis the most Top 5 hits of any British female solo artist. In 2015, Lewis released the studio album "I Am", which charted on the top 40 in several countries, including in the UK and US. In 2018, Lewis sang alongside Calum Scott on the duet version of "You Are The Reason", to international success. In 2019, Lewis released "Solo Quiero (Somebody to Love)", from Songland. In 2021, Lewis released the single "Kiss Me It's Christmas" featuring Ne-Yo, taken from the digital and vinyl re-issue of Lewis' 2013 album Christmas, with Love, entitled "Christmas, with Love Always".

As of 2021, Lewis has sold in excess of 40 million records worldwide.

== Albums ==
=== Studio albums ===
List of studio albums, with selected chart positions, certifications and sales figures
Title	Details	Peak chart positions										Certifications	Sales
Title	Details	UK	AUS	AUT	CAN	GER	IRL	NZ	SWE	SWI	US	Certifications	Sales
Spirit	Released: 9 November 2007; Label: Syco, Sony BMG, J; Formats: CD, Vinyl, digital download	1	1	1	1	1	1	1	2	1	1	BPI: 10× Platinum; ARIA: Platinum; BVMI: 3× Platinum; IFPI AUT: Platinum; IFPI SWE: Gold; IFPI SWI: 2× Platinum; IRMA: 11× Platinum; MC: Platinum; RIAA: Platinum; RMNZ: 2× Platinum	UK: 3,132,668; US: 1,800,000; World: 10,000,000
Echo	Released: 9 November 2009; Label: Syco, Sony Music, J; Formats: CD, digital download	1	31	7	16	12	2	26	7	3	13	BPI: 2× Platinum; BVMI: Gold; IFPI AUT: Gold; IFPI SWI: Gold; IRMA: Platinum; MC: Gold	UK: 700,000; US: 200,000; World: 3,000,000
Glassheart	Released: 12 October 2012; Label: Syco, Sony Music, RCA; Formats: CD, digital download	3	—	5	—	6	4	—	—	29	—	BPI: Silver	UK: 90,000
Christmas, with Love	Released: 2 December 2013; Label: Syco, Sony Music, RCA; Formats: CD, digital download	13	—	—	97	28	36	—	—	42	113	BPI: Gold	UK: 180,000; US: 23,000
I Am	Released: 11 September 2015; Label: Island, Def Jam; Formats: CD, digital download	12	82	34	—	33	22	—	—	23	38		
"—" denotes albums that did not chart or were not released

=== Re-issue ===
Title	Details
Christmas, with Love Always	Released: 19 November 2021; Label: RCA; Formats: CD, digital download

=== Video album ===
List of video albums, with selected chart positions and certifications
Title	Details	Peak chart positions			Certifications
Title	Details	UK	SPA	SWI	Certifications
The Labyrinth Tour Live from The O2	Released: 29 November 2010; Label: Syco, Sony Music; Formats: Blu-ray, DVD, CD	4	17	59	BPI: Gold

=== Demo albums ===
List of demo albums
Title	Details	Peak chart positions
Title	Details	JP
Twilight	Released: 2004; Label: Crisler Music; Formats: CD, digital download	—
Best Kept Secret	Released: 2005; Label: Boombee Music; Formats: CD, digital download	124

=== Extended play ===
List of extended plays, with selected chart positions
Title	Details	Peak chart positions			
Title	Details	UK	UK Digital	IRL	SCO
Hurt: The EP	Released: 9 December 2011; Label: Syco, Sony Music, RCA; Format: Digital download	8	7	15	7

== Singles ==
=== As lead artist ===
List of singles, with selected chart positions and certifications, showing year released as single and album name
Title	Year	Peak chart positions										Certifications	Album
Title	Year	UK	AUS	AUT	CAN	GER	IRL	NZ	SWE	SWI	US	Certifications	Album
"A Moment Like This"	2006	1	—	—	—	—	1	—	—	—	—	BPI: Platinum	Spirit
"Bleeding Love"	2007	1	1	1	1	1	1	1	2	1	1	BPI: 4× Platinum; ARIA: 2× Platinum; BVMI: 5× Gold; IFPI AUT: Gold; IFPI SWE: Gold; MC: Platinum; RIAA: Platinum; RMNZ: 5× Platinum	Spirit
"Better in Time" (Note: "Better in Time" was released as a double A-side with "Footprints in the Sand" in the UK, Australia and Germany. "Footprints in the Sand" charted at 25 and "Better in Time" charted at number 23 in the UK Singles Chart due to individual downloads.)	2008	2	6	3	9	2	4	6	5	5	11	BPI: Platinum; ARIA: Gold; BVMI: Gold; RMNZ: Platinum	Spirit
"Footprints in the Sand"	2008	2	6	—	—	2	50	—	—	35	—	BPI: Silver	Spirit
"Forgive Me"	2008	5	49	15	—	15	5	—	7	12	—	BPI: Silver	Spirit
"Run"	2008	1	78	1	13	3	1	—	13	2	81	BPI: 2× Platinum; BVMI: 2× Platinum; IFPI AUT: Gold; RMNZ: Gold	Spirit
"I Will Be"	2009	160	—	—	83	—	—	—	—	—	66		Spirit
"Happy"	2009	2	26	2	15	3	3	20	11	4	31	BPI: Silver; MC: Gold	Echo
"I Got You"	2010	14	—	30	—	43	43	29	—	57	—	BPI: Silver	Echo
"Collide" (with Avicii)	2011	4	—	29	—	—	3	—	—	—	— (Note: "Collide" did not enter the Billboard Hot 100, but peaked at No. 1 on the Dance Club Songs.)	BPI: Silver	Non-album single
"Trouble" (featuring Childish Gambino)	2012	7	—	32	—	27	21	—	—	75	—		Glassheart
"Lovebird"	2012	—	—	—	—	—	—	—	—	—	—		Glassheart
"One More Sleep"	2013	3	98	68	92	76	19	—	—	54	— (Note: "One More Sleep" did not enter the Billboard Hot 100, but peaked at number 23 on the Holiday Digital Songs Chart.)	BPI: 3× Platinum; RMNZ: Gold	Christmas, with Love
"Fire Under My Feet"	2015	51	—	74	—	94	—	—	—	—	— (Note: "Fire Under My Feet" did not enter the Billboard Hot 100, but peaked at No. 4 on the Dance Club Songs.)		I Am
"I Am"	2015	—	—	—	—	—	—	—	—	—	—		I Am
"Thunder"	2015	—	—	—	— (Note: "Thunder" did not enter the Canadian Billboard Hot 100, but peaked at No. 44 on the Canada Adult Contemporary.)	—	—	—	—	—	— (Note: "Thunder" did not enter the Billboard Hot 100, but peaked at No. 12 on the Dance Club Songs.)		I Am
"You Are the Reason" (with Calum Scott)	2018	43	27	—	76	—	55	—	— (Note: "You Are the Reason" did not enter the Sverigetopplistan, but peaked at No. 1 on the Sweden Heatseeker Chart.)	20	— (Note: "You Are the Reason" did not enter the Billboard Hot 100, but peaked at No. 23 on the Bubbling Under Hot 100.)	BPI: Platinum; ARIA: 2× Platinum; MC: 2× Platinum; RIAA: Platinum	Only Human
"Solo Quiero (Somebody to Love)" (with Cali y El Dandee and Juan Magán)	2019	—	—	—	—	—	—	—	—	—	— (Note: "Solo Quiero (Somebody to Love)" did not enter the Billboard Hot 100, but peaked at number two on the Latin Pop Digital Song Sales.)		Songland
"Kiss Me It's Christmas" (featuring Ne-Yo)	2021	87	—	—	—	—	—	—	—	—	—		Christmas, with Love Always
"One Step Closer"	2023	—	—	—	—	—	—	—	—	—	—		Non-album singles
"Give a Little Bit" (with Calum Scott)	2024	—	—	—	—	—	—	—	—	—	—		Non-album singles
"This Version (The View Theme)"	2024	—	—	—	—	—	—	—	—	—	—		Non-album singles
"Rise Up" (with Rita Ora, Rashed Al Nuaimi & Carole Samaha)	2026	—	—	—	—	—	—	—	—	—	—		Non-album singles
"—" denotes singles that did not chart or were not released

=== As featured artist ===
List of singles as guest vocalist, with selected chart positions, showing year released and certifications
Title	Year	Peak chart positions										Certifications
Title	Year	UK	AUS	AUT	CAN	GER	IRL	NZ	SWE	SWI	US	Certifications
"Just Stand Up!" (as part of Artists Stand Up to Cancer)	2008	26	39	73	10	—	11	19	51	—	11	RIAA: 2× Platinum
"Inaspettata (Unexpected)" (Biagio Antonacci featuring Leona Lewis)	2010	—	—	—	—	—	—	—	—	—	—	
"Everybody Hurts" (as part of Helping Haiti)	2010	1	28	23	59	16	1	17	21	16	—	BPI: Platinum
"Bridge over Troubled Water" (as part of Artists for Grenfell)	2017	1	53	32	—	—	25	—	— (Note: "Bridge over Troubled Water" did not enter the NZ Top 40 Singles Chart, but peaked at number four on the NZ Heatseekers Singles Chart.)	28	—	BPI: Gold
"Amore" (Pitbull featuring Leona Lewis)	2018	—	—	—	—	—	—	—	—	—	—	
"Headlights" (with Hellberg)	2018	—	—	—	—	—	—	—	—	—	—	
"One Look" (Alexis Ffrench featuring Leona Lewis)	2022	—	—	—	—	—	—	—	—	—	—	
"—" denotes singles that did not chart or were not released

=== Promotional singles ===
List of promotional singles, showing year released and album name
Title	Year	Album
"Another Love Song"	2015	I Am
"Power"	2015	I Am
"If I Can't Have You"	2021	Christmas, with Love Always

== Other charted songs ==
List of singles, with selected chart positions, showing year charted and album name
Title	Year	Peak chart positions											Album/single
Title	Year	UK	UK Dance	UK Digital	UK R&B	GER	IRL	JPN	SK	KOR (Int.)	US Bub.	US A/C	Album/single
"Forgiveness"	2007	46	—	—	—	—	39	—	—	—	—	—	B-side to "Bleeding Love"
"Whatever It Takes"	2007	61	—	—	—	—	—	—	—	—	—	—	Spirit
"Homeless"	2007	173	—	—	—	—	—	—	—	—	—	—	Spirit
"Yesterday"	2007	137	—	—	—	—	—	—	—	—	17	—	Spirit
"Take a Bow"	2007	97	—	—	—	—	—	—	—	—	—	—	Spirit
"Angel"	2007	185	—	—	—	—	—	—	—	—	—	—	Spirit
"Here I Am"	2007	156	—	—	—	—	—	—	—	—	—	—	Spirit
"The Best You Never Had"	2007	180	—	—	—	—	—	—	—	—	—	—	Spirit
"The First Time Ever I Saw Your Face"	2007	73	—	—	—	—	—	—	—	—	—	—	Spirit
"Misses Glass"	2008	98	—	—	—	—	—	—	—	—	—	—	Spirit
"Private Party"	2008	—	—	—	—	—	—	69	—	—	—	—	Best Kept Secret
"Outta My Head"	2009	—	—	—	—	—	—	—	98	—	—	—	Echo
"Stop Crying Your Heart Out"	2009	29	—	27	11	—	31	—	—	—	—	—	Echo
"I See You (Theme from Avatar)"	2009	—	—	—	—	—	47	—	—	—	—	24	Avatar: Music from the Motion Picture
"My Hands"	2010	145	—	—	—	—	—	—	—	—	—	—	Echo
"Love Letter"	2010	—	—	—	—	—	—	—	—	28	—	—	Echo
"Glassheart"	2012	167	27	—	—	—	—	—	—	—	—	—	Glassheart
"Christmas (Baby Please Come Home)"	2013	—	—	—	—	—	—	—	—	49	—	—	Christmas, with Love
"O Holy Night"	2013	—	—	—	—	—	86	—	—	—	—	—	Christmas, with Love
"Winter Wonderland"	2018	—	—	—	—	54	—	—	—	—	—	—	Christmas, with Love
"—" denotes unavailable chart data, was not released in that territory or failed to chart

== Other appearances ==
List of non-single songs which do not feature on an album by Lewis
Title	Year	Album(s)	Artist	Notes
"Times Have Changed"	2008	Frequently Asked Questions	Silent Earth and Leona Lewis	
"Perfection"	2009	Ready for Love	Tata Young	Co-writer
"Love Is Your Color"	2010	Sex and the City 2: Original Motion Picture Soundtrack and I Remember Me (2011)	Jennifer Hudson and Leona Lewis	
"I Know Who I Am"	2010	For Colored Girls: Music From and Inspired by the Original Motion Picture Soundtrack	Leona Lewis	
"Run" (live from the Live Lounge)	2011	The Best of BBC Radio 1's Live Lounge	Leona Lewis	Original live version
"Let the Sun Shine" (live from the Live Lounge)	2011	Radio 1's Live Lounge – Volume 6	Leona Lewis	Labrinth cover
"1,000 Lights"	2011	Come Through for You	Javier Colon	Co-writer
"Fix Me"	2013	SYLDD	Ricky Hil featuring Leona Lewis	
"Ain't No Mountain High Enough"	2014	Ain't No Mountain High Enough: A Tribute to Hitsville (International edition)	Michael Bolton featuring Leona Lewis	
"How Will I Know"	2014	Walking on Sunshine OST	Hannah Arterton, Danny Kirrane, Giulio Corso and Leona Lewis	
"The Power of Love"	2014	Walking on Sunshine OST	Hannah Arterton, Annabel Scholey, Katy Brand, Danny Kirrane, Giulio Corso, Giulio Berruti and Leona Lewis	
"Walking on Sunshine"	2014	Walking on Sunshine OST	Leona Lewis, Hannah Arterton, Katy Brand, Danny Kirrane, Giulio Corso and Giulio Berruti	
"Girls Just Wanna Have Fun"	2014	Walking on Sunshine OST	Leona Lewis, Hannah Arterton and Katy Brand	
"Wake Me Up Before You Go-Go"	2014	Walking on Sunshine OST	Leona Lewis, Danny Kirrane, Katy Brand, Hannah Arterton, Annabel Scholey, Giulio Corso, Greg Wise and Giulio Berruti	
"Catch Me When I Fall"	2015	A Fall to Rise	The Poet featuring Leona Lewis	
"Shine a Little Light"	2016		Bianca Claxton	Co-writer. See United Kingdom in the Eurovision Song Contest 2016
"Time After Time"	2016	BBC Radio 2's Sounds of the 80s, Vol. 2	Leona Lewis	
"(We All Are) Looking for Home"	2016	Public Service Announcement	Leona Lewis & Diane Warren	Performer
"Now We Are Free"	2016	Hans Zimmer: The Classics	Leona Lewis	
"Only Ones to Know"	2017	Climate Change	Pitbull (featuring Leona Lewis)	
"What The World Needs Now (Is Love)"	2020		Smokey Robinson (featuring Leona Lewis, Tori Kelly and Sam Fischer)	
"Grow Old with Me"	2021	The Cave Sessions: Vol 1	Diane Warren, Leona Lewis & James Morrison	
"All I Need"	2026	Here Because of Hope	Ezra Collective (featuring Leona Lewis)	

== Music videos ==
List of videos, showing year released and director
Title	Year	Director
"A Moment Like This"	2006	Jessy Terrero
"Bleeding Love"	2007	Melina Matsoukas
"Bleeding Love" (US version)	2008	Jessy Terrero
"Better in Time"	2008	Sophie Muller
"Footprints in the Sand"	2008	Sophie Muller
"Just Stand Up!" (as part of Artists Stand Up to Cancer)	2008	Don Mischer
"Forgive Me"	2008	Wayne Isham
"Run"	2008	Jake Nava
"I Will Be"	2009	Melina Matsoukas
"Happy"	2009	Jake Nava
"I See You (Theme from Avatar)"	2009	Jake Nava
"I Got You"	2010	Dave Meyers
"Everybody Hurts" (as part of Helping Haiti)	2010	Joseph Kahn
"Inaspettata (Unexpected)" (with Biagio Antonacci)	2010	Gaetano Morbioli
"Collide" (with Avicii)	2011	Ethan Lader
"Trouble"	2012	Raul B. Fernandez
"Lovebird"	2012	Trudy Bellinger
"One More Sleep"	2013	Dominic O'Riordan & Warren Smith
"Fire Under My Feet"	2015	Declan Whitebloom
"Thunder"	2015	Sarah McColgan
"You Are the Reason" (with Calum Scott)	2018	Richard Pengelley
"Headlights" (with Hellberg)	2018	Frank Borin
"Solo Quiero (Somebody to Love)" (with Cali y El Dandee and Juan Magán) (from Songland)	2019	Tabitha Denholm
"I Am"	2020	
"Kiss Me It's Christmas" (featuring Ne-Yo)	2021	Blake Claridge
"One Look" (Alex Ffrench featuring Leona Lewis)	2022	
