= List of awards and nominations received by Leona Lewis =

Leona Lewis awards and nominations
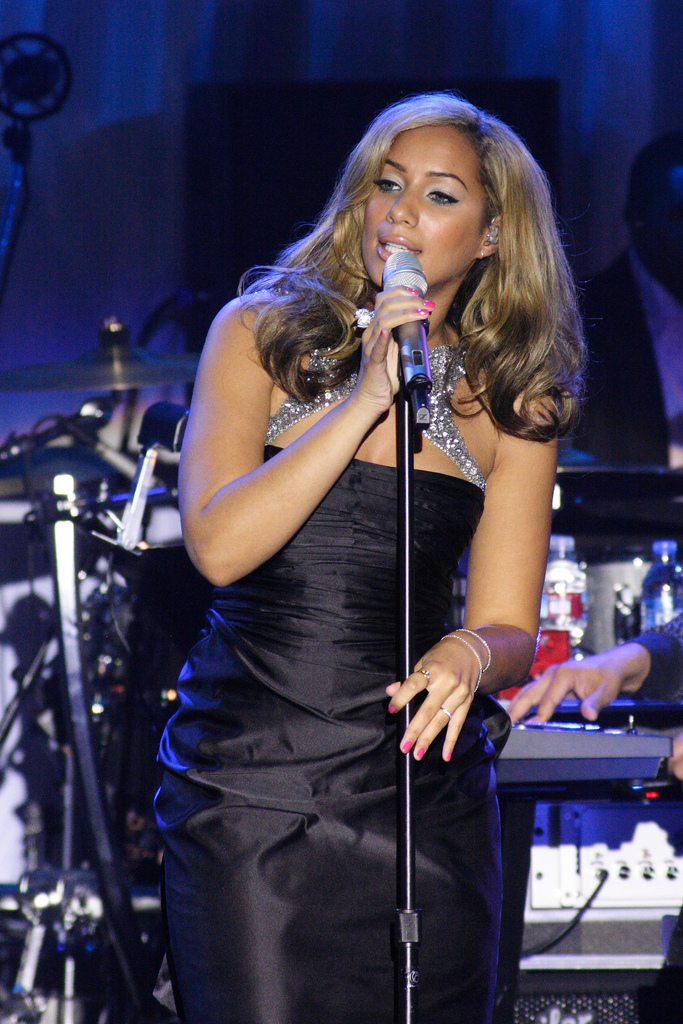
- Lewis in 2009
Awards and nominations
Award	Wins	Nominations
Brit	0	7
Grammy	0	3
MOBO	2	4
MTV Asia	1	1
MTV Europe	2	6
MTV VMA	0	1
NAACP	0	1
Teen Choice	0	2
World Music	2	8
Virgin Media Awards	2	2
Other awards	27	34

Totals (Note: Certain award groups do not simply award one winner. They acknowledge several different recipients, have runners-up, and have third place. Since this is a specific recognition and is different from losing an award, runner-up mentions are considered wins in this award tally. For simplification and to avoid errors, each award in this list has been presumed to have had a prior nomination.)
- Wins: 36
- Nominations: 70

English singer Leona Lewis has received 36 awards from 70 nominations. She is the winner of the third series of The X Factor in the UK and has released five studio albums. She has released twenty-five singles, five of which have reached number one in various singles charts.

Lewis has received nominations in a variety of awards, including seven nominations for BRIT Awards, three nominations for Grammy Awards, two MOBO Awards, two MTV Europe Music Awards and two Teen Choice Awards nominations. Her international breakthrough single, "Bleeding Love", received a total of ten awards from 16 nominations. Her debut studio album, Spirit, won two awards from six nominations.

== APRA Awards ==
Year	Nominee / work	Award	Result
2009	"Bleeding Love"	Most Played Foreign Work	Won

== Bambi Awards ==
Year	Nominee / work	Award	Result
2008	Leona Lewis	Shooting Star	Won

== BEFFTA Awards ==
Year	Nominee / work	Award	Result
2009	Leona Lewis	Best Female Act	Won

== Billboard Year End Award ==
Year	Nominee / work	Award	Result
2008	Leona Lewis	Best New Artist	Won

== BRIT Awards ==
The BRIT Awards are the British Phonographic Industry's annual pop music awards. Lewis has received seven nominations across four years, including three nominations in the British Single category. In 2008, Lewis was the favourite to win the most awards.

Year	Nominee / work	Award	Result
2007	"A Moment Like This"	British Single	Nominated
2008	Leona Lewis	British Female Solo Artist	Nominated
2008	Leona Lewis	British Breakthrough Act	Nominated
2008	Spirit	British Album	Nominated
2008	"Bleeding Love"	British Single	Nominated
2009	"Better in Time"	British Single	Nominated
2010	Leona Lewis	British Female Solo Artist	Nominated

== Britain's Best Awards ==
Year	Nominee / work	Award	Result
2008	Leona Lewis	Music Award	Won

== Capital Awards ==
Year	Nominee / work	Award	Result
2008	Leona Lewis	Favourite UK Female Artist	Won

== CMT Music Awards ==
Year	Nominee / work	Award	Result
2016	"Girl Crush" with Adam Lambert	CMT Performance of the Year	Nominated

== Cosmopolitan Awards ==
Year	Nominee / work	Award	Result
2009	Leona Lewis	Ultimate Music Star	Won

== Cosmopolitan Ultimate Woman of the Year ==
Year	Nominee / work	Award	Result
2007	Leona Lewis	Newcomer of the Year	Won

== Gaygalan Awards ==
Since 1999, the Gaygalan Awards are a Swedish accolade presented by the QX magazine. Lewis has received one nomination.

Year	Nominee / work	Award	Result	Ref.
2009	"Bleeding Love"	International Song of the Year	Nominated	

== Glamour Awards ==
Year	Nominee / work	Award	Result
2008	Leona Lewis	UK Solo Artist	Won

== Grammy Awards ==
The Grammy Awards are awarded annually by the National Academy of Recording Arts and Sciences of the United States. Lewis has received three nominations and became the first X Factor contestant to be nominated for a Grammy award.

Year	Nominee / work	Award	Result
2009	"Bleeding Love"	Record of the Year	Nominated
2009	"Bleeding Love"	Best Female Pop Vocal Performance	Nominated
2009	Spirit	Best Pop Vocal Album	Nominated

== HITO Awards ==
Year	Nominee / work	Award	Result
2009	"Bleeding Love"	Best Western Song	Won

== Hollywood Music in Media Awards ==
Year	Nominee / work	Award	Result
2023	"One Step Closer" (from Jane)	Best Original Song in a TV Show/Limited Series	Nominated

== Japan Gold Disc Awards ==
Year	Nominee / work	Award	Result
2009	Leona Lewis	New Artist of the Year	Won

== MOBO Awards ==
Year	Nominee / work	Award	Result
2008	Spirit	Best Album	Won
2008	"Bleeding Love"	Best Video	Won
2008	Leona Lewis	Best UK Female	Nominated
2010	Leona Lewis	Best UK Act	Nominated

== MTV Awards ==
=== MTV Video Music Awards ===
The MTV Video Music Awards is an annual awards ceremony established in 1984 by MTV. Lewis has received one nomination.

Year	Nominee / work	Award	Result
2008	"Bleeding Love"	Best UK Video	Nominated

=== MTV Europe Music Awards ===
Year	Nominee / work	Award	Result
2008	Leona Lewis	Best UK + Ireland Act	Won
2008	Leona Lewis	Act of 2008	Nominated
2008	Leona Lewis	Europe's Favourite	Nominated
2008	Spirit	Album of the Year	Nominated
2009	Leona Lewis	Best Female	Nominated
2017	For the Artists for Grenfell initiative	Power of Music Award	Won

=== MTV Asia Awards ===
MTV Asia Awards is another annual award established in 2002 by MTV. Lewis has won one award.

Year	Nominee / work	Award	Result
2008	Leona Lewis	Breakthrough Artist	Won

=== MTV Video Music Awards Japan ===
Year	Nominee / work	Award	Result
2010	"Happy"	Best Pop Video	Nominated
2010	"I See You"	Best Video from a Film	Nominated

== Music Week Awards ==
Year	Nominee / work	Award	Result
2022	Leona Lewis	Catalogue Marketing Campaign	Nominated

== NAACP Image Awards ==
Year	Nominee / work	Award	Result
2009	Leona Lewis	Outstanding New Artist	Nominated

== NewNowNext Awards ==
Year	Nominee / work	Award	Result
2008	Leona Lewis	The Kylie Award: Next International Crossover	Won

== New Music Weekly Awards ==
Year	Nominee / work	Award	Result
2008	Leona Lewis	Top 40 New Artist of the Year	Won

== Nickelodeon UK Kids Choice Awards ==
Year	Nominee / work	Award	Result
2008	"Bleeding Love"	Favourite Song	Won

== NME Awards ==
Year	Nominee / work	Award	Result
2008	Spirit	Worst Album	Nominated

== NRJ Music Awards ==
Year	Nominee / work	Award	Result
2009	Leona Lewis	International New Artist of the Year	Nominated

== PETA ==
Year	Nominee / work	Award	Result
2008	Leona Lewis	Person of the Year	Won

== PETA - Sexiest Vegetarian Alive Awards ==
Year	Nominee / work	Award	Result
2009	Leona Lewis	Sexiest Vegetarian Celebrity 2009	Won

== Popjustice 20 Quid Music Prize ==
Year	Nominee / work	Award	Result
2014	"One More Sleep"	Best British Pop Single	Nominated

== Record of the Year ==
Year	Nominee / work	Award	Result
2007	"Bleeding Love"	The Record of the Year	Won

== Swiss Music Awards ==
Year	Nominee / work	Award	Result
2009	Leona Lewis	Best International Newcomer	Won

== Teen Choice Awards ==
Year	Nominee / work	Award	Result
2008	Leona Lewis	Choice Music: Breakthrough Artist	Nominated
2008	"Bleeding Love"	Choice Music: Love Song	Nominated

== UK Music Video Awards ==
Year	Nominee / work	Award	Result
2008	"Bleeding Love"	People's Choice Award	Won

== Urban Music Awards ==
Year	Nominee / work	Award	Result
2008	Spirit	Best Album 2008	Won
2008	Leona Lewis	Best R&B Act	Won

== Vh1 Video of the Year ==
Year	Nominee / work	Award	Result
2008	"Bleeding Love"	Best Video	Won

== Virgin Media Music Awards ==
Year	Nominee / work	Award	Result
2007	"Bleeding Love"	Best Track	Won
2008	Leona Lewis	Best UK Act	Won

== VEVOCertified Awards ==
The VEVOCertified Awards is an rewarding the music videos that reached the mark of 100 million views on YouTube.

Year	Nominee / work	Award	Result
2012	"Bleeding Love"	100.000.000 Views	Won
2015	"Bleeding Love" US version	100.000.000 Views	Won
2017	"Better in Time"	100.000.000 Views	Won

== World Music Awards ==
Year	Nominee / work	Award	Result
2008	Leona Lewis	Best Pop Female	Won
2008	Leona Lewis	Best New Artist	Won
2008	Leona Lewis	Best Selling R&B Female	Nominated
2014	Leona Lewis	World's Best Female Artist	Nominated
2014	Leona Lewis	World's Best Live Act	Nominated
2014	Leona Lewis	World's Best Entertainer	Nominated
2014	"One More Sleep"	World's Best Song	Nominated
2014	"One More Sleep"	World's Best Video	Nominated

== Footnotes ==
- 1. From those outlined in side table only
