= A Starry Night =

Concert residency by Leona Lewis

- Residency by Leona Lewis
- Promotional poster for the residency
- Location: Paradise, Nevada, U.S.
- Venue: Voltaire at The Venetian Las Vegas
- Associated album: Christmas, with Love
- Start date: 30 October 2025
- End date: 3 January 2026
- Legs: 1
- No. of shows: 34

Leona Lewis concert chronology
- Christmas With Love Tour (2023); A Starry Night (2025–2026)

A Starry Night was a concert residency by British singer-songwriter Leona Lewis. It began on 30 October 2025 at Voltaire at The Venetian Las Vegas, and concluded on 3 January 2026. The residency marks Lewis' first set of shows in the United States, and includes material from her christmas album Christmas, with Love (2013), alongside covers of songs by artists such as Frank Sinatra and Whitney Houston.

== Background ==
In July 2025, Lewis announced the residency through an Instagram post, revealing 34 dates scheduled to take place between 30 October 2025 and 3 January 2026. Commenting on the residency, Lewis stated "I’m elated to bring this show to Voltaire as it’s been years in the making, made specially for my fans", and "Christmas has always been such a special time for me and my family and there’s nothing quite like the energy of Las Vegas during the holidays. Can’t wait to take the stage!".

In an interview with People magazine in December 2025, Lewis explained her reason for not previously touring in America, stating: "I didn’t really have time to just come here to America and tour because I was having to travel everywhere", and "I feel like I’m getting a second chance to do that, which is lovely". She also discussed her intentions with the show, stating: "With this show I would love it if I could come off [stage] and people just know me more as a person", while also expressing hope that she would be able to share her Christmas music with a broader audience.

== Concept ==
According to Em Jurbala of Las Vegas Magazine, the show opens with "a phone call from Coco", Lewis' daughter, which "sets the show's upbeat yet sentimental tone", where Lewis performs holiday classics like "Winter Wonderland" and "Santa Claus is Comin' to Town". There are some "breathtaking fashion moments", including an outfit Lewis wears of a shimmering gown that "cascades down from the hanging moon prop from which Lewis sings 'Fly Me to the Moon'". Further, Lewis performs upbeat songs including 'Mr Right' and 'One More Sleep', as well as a "phenomenal" performance of her hit "Bleeding Love".

== Set list ==
This set list is from the October 30, 2025, concert.

1. "Winter Wonderland"
2. "Santa Claus Is Comin' to Town"
3. "O Holy Night"
4. "Better in Time"
5. "Mr. Sandman"
6. "Mr. Right"
7. "Have Yourself a Merry Little Christmas"
8. "Merry Christmas, Baby"
9. "Run"
10. "Fly Me to the Moon"
11. "You Are the Reason"
12. "Bleeding Love"
13. "Higher Love"
14. "One More Sleep"

== Shows ==
Shows (2025)
| Date (2025) | City | Country | Venue |
|---|---|---|---|
| October 30 | Paradise (Note: Labeled as Las Vegas in promotional material.) | United States | Voltaire at The Venetian Las Vegas |
| November 1 | Paradise | United States | Voltaire at The Venetian Las Vegas |
| November 2 | Paradise | United States | Voltaire at The Venetian Las Vegas |
| November 5 | Paradise | United States | Voltaire at The Venetian Las Vegas |
| November 7 | Paradise | United States | Voltaire at The Venetian Las Vegas |
| November 8 | Paradise | United States | Voltaire at The Venetian Las Vegas |
| November 9 | Paradise | United States | Voltaire at The Venetian Las Vegas |
| November 12 | Paradise | United States | Voltaire at The Venetian Las Vegas |
| November 14 | Paradise | United States | Voltaire at The Venetian Las Vegas |
| November 15 | Paradise | United States | Voltaire at The Venetian Las Vegas |
| November 16 | Paradise | United States | Voltaire at The Venetian Las Vegas |
| November 25 | Paradise | United States | Voltaire at The Venetian Las Vegas |
| November 27 | Paradise | United States | Voltaire at The Venetian Las Vegas |
| November 28 | Paradise | United States | Voltaire at The Venetian Las Vegas |
| November 29 | Paradise | United States | Voltaire at The Venetian Las Vegas |
| December 5 | Paradise | United States | Voltaire at The Venetian Las Vegas |
| December 6 | Paradise | United States | Voltaire at The Venetian Las Vegas |
| December 7 | Paradise | United States | Voltaire at The Venetian Las Vegas |
| December 10 | Paradise | United States | Voltaire at The Venetian Las Vegas |
| December 12 | Paradise | United States | Voltaire at The Venetian Las Vegas |
| December 13 | Paradise | United States | Voltaire at The Venetian Las Vegas |
| December 14 | Paradise | United States | Voltaire at The Venetian Las Vegas |
| December 17 | Paradise | United States | Voltaire at The Venetian Las Vegas |
| December 19 | Paradise | United States | Voltaire at The Venetian Las Vegas |
| December 16 | Paradise | United States | Voltaire at The Venetian Las Vegas |
| December 24 | Paradise | United States | Voltaire at The Venetian Las Vegas |
| December 26 | Paradise | United States | Voltaire at The Venetian Las Vegas |
| December 27 | Paradise | United States | Voltaire at The Venetian Las Vegas |
| December 28 | Paradise | United States | Voltaire at The Venetian Las Vegas |
| December 30 | Paradise | United States | Voltaire at The Venetian Las Vegas |
| December 31 | Paradise | United States | Voltaire at The Venetian Las Vegas |

Shows (2026)
| Date (2026) | City | Country | Venue |
|---|---|---|---|
| January 2 | Paradise | United States | Voltaire at The Venetian Las Vegas |
| January 3 | Paradise | United States | Voltaire at The Venetian Las Vegas |

=== Cancelled shows ===
Cancelled dates for A Starry Night
| Date | Reason | Ref. |
|---|---|---|
| December 20 | Sore throat | |
| December 21 | Sore throat | |
