= Christmas, with Love =

Studio album by Leona Lewis
- Released: 29 November 2013
- Recorded: 2013
- Studios: Angel Studios (London, England); Biffco Studios (Brighton, England)
- Genre: Christmas
- Length: 32:40
- Label: Syco
- Producers: Richard "Biff" Stannard; Ash Howes; Leona Lewis

Leona Lewis chronology
Glassheart (2012)	Christmas, with Love (2013)	I Am (2015)

Singles from Christmas, with Love
- 1. "One More Sleep" Released: 5 November 2013

Alternative cover
- Reissue cover

Singles from Christmas, with Love Always
- 1. "Kiss Me It's Christmas" Released: 2 November 2021

Christmas, with Love is a Christmas album and the fourth studio album by English singer Leona Lewis. It was released on 29 November 2013, by Syco Music and RCA Records. Work on the album began in February 2013, during which Lewis began writing "immediately" after the release of her less-commercially successful album Glassheart (2012). In June 2013, it was revealed (and later confirmed) that Lewis' fourth studio album would be a Christmas album, based on the recommendation of Syco boss Simon Cowell. Lewis enlisted two producers for the album: Richard "Biff" Stannard and Ash Howes, with Lewis herself contributing to the album's production. This is Lewis' first album to be released in North America since 2009's Echo, as her 2012 album, Glassheart, was not released there.

Upon release, Christmas, with Love was met with positive reviews from critics, praising the album's original songs as well as Howes and Stannard's use of Phil Spector's famed Wall of Sound technique, with AllMusic calling it "one of the best modern Christmas albums in memory." Initially, the album charted at twenty five in the United Kingdom; the following week, the album rose to number thirteen on the chart becoming Lewis' lowest-charting album to date. However, it was certified Gold by the British Phonographic Industry (BPI) for shipments of 100,000 copies within four weeks of its release, and has since become the thirteenth best selling Christmas album in the United Kingdom as of December 2016. With sales of more than 122,000 units, the Official Charts Company ranked the album among the twenty biggest-selling Christmas albums of the century in 2018.

The album was preceded by one single "One More Sleep", which was released on 5 November 2013. Lewis promoted the song through a large amount of live performances, including the Regent Street Christmas lights switch-on event in London, England and on the tenth series of The X Factor; this led to the song peaking at number 3 on the UK Singles Chart, her highest-charting entry since 2009's "Happy." Dubbed as a "modern festive classic," the song has been recognised to be one of the biggest-selling Christmas songs in the UK. On 19 November 2021, the album was repackaged digitally and on vinyl, entitled Christmas, with Love Always, with two new tracks, including "Kiss Me It's Christmas" featuring American singer Ne-Yo which was released as a single digitally in November 2021. In November–December 2023, following a delay due to her pregnancy, Lewis promoted the album by headlining a UK tour called Christmas, with Love Tour. This was followed in 2025 by a concert residency further promoting the album in the United States, A Starry Night, taking place at The Venetian Las Vegas.

== Background and recording ==
Simon Cowell (pictured) came up with the idea for Lewis to record a Christmas album.

In February 2013, a representative from Syco Music, Lewis' record label, announced that she was about to start writing and recording material "imminently" for her fourth studio album, and that it would be released in late 2013. The news came after Lewis announced that she had parted ways from Modest! Management, the management team who had represented her since she won the third series of The X Factor in 2006. Various media outlets speculated that this was due to the weak commercial performance of her third studio album, Glassheart, which was released in November 2012. It became her first album to not debut at number one or earn platinum certification in the United Kingdom. It was also reported that the second single from the album, "Lovebird", had sold fewer than 600 copies, meaning it failed to attain one of 200 chart positions on the UK Singles Chart, was another contributing factor to her departure.

In June 2013, speculation arose that Lewis' fourth album would in fact be a Christmas album, after British production duo MagicIT tweeted that they were in a studio recording Christmas songs with the singer. The following month, Lewis confirmed that she was indeed in the process of recording a Christmas album. She revealed that it was recorded on the recommendation of Syco boss Simon Cowell. Speaking about the decision to record a Christmas album at this point in her career in July 2013, further explained how Cowell had come up with the idea: "Simon is still very much involved in my career and helps me out. He came up with the Christmas album idea, and we both kind of felt it was the right time to go ahead with it."

In an interview for Billboard magazine in November 2013, Lewis stated that she had thought about doing a Christmas album for a while, but did not intend on releasing one in for Christmas 2013, as she thought her she would be writing and recording the follow-up to Glassheart instead after she had finished her Glassheart Tour, which lasted from April to July and saw her tour Germany, Switzerland and the United Kingdom. However, she decided that she wanted to do something "a bit different" instead. Recording sessions began during the summer in Brighton, England; speaking about recording Christmas songs during the heatwave that struck the country, Lewis said "We turned up the A/C, basically." Lewis unveiled the artwork for Christmas, with Love on 4 November 2013. It has a vintage theme, which includes the track list on the front cover, as well as nine different photos of Lewis posing with various Christmas objects.

== Release and promotion ==
On 4 November 2013, Lewis, along with the vintage-themed artwork, revealed the track list for Christmas, with Love which comprises three original songs co-written by Lewis ― "One More Sleep", "Mr Right" and "Your Hallelujah" ― and seven covers. The album was eventually released on 29 November 2013 in Germany, Ireland and Switzerland. It was followed by the United Kingdom on 2 December, Canada, Italy and the United States on 3 December. In the US, Lewis autographed a limited amount of Christmas, with Love album covers which were made available to people who pre-ordered a copy on Walmart online.

Lewis embarked on a promotional tour across Europe prior to the album's release. Throughout November, she embarked on a radio and print promotional tour in the UK and gave interviews about the album with various radio stations, magazines and newspapers, including Heat, Radar, and the Daily Mirror. On 9 November 2013, Lewis performed "One More Sleep" and "White Christmas" for the first time at the Regent Street Christmas lights switch-on event in London, England. On 22 November, the singer gave a free concert in Zurich, Switzerland, at the NRJ Energy Stars for Free Festival in front of audience of 13,000 people. On 29 November, Lewis performed "Winter Wonderland" live on Daybreak. In the United States, Lewis appeared on NBC's Today morning show on 4 December in New York City to talk about the album. On the same day, she performed at the Rockefeller Center Christmas Tree lighting event, where she performed "White Christmas", "One More Sleep" and "I Wish It Could Be Christmas Everyday". The following day, on 5 December, Lewis made an appearance on Live with Kelly and Michael. Lewis also performed "One More Sleep" live at the semi-finals of the tenth series of The X Factor on 8 December 2013.

In 2021, Lewis announced that a repackaged version of the album, entitled Christmas, with Love Always, with two new tracks included, would be released on 19 November 2021. In December, she promoted the reissue on several occasions, singing "One More Sleep" on several TV appearances, such as This Morning, The Jonathan Ross Show, and I Can See Your Voice, and sang "O Holy Night" at the Royal Carols: Together at Christmas concert, hosted by Catherine, Duchess of Cambridge, at Westminster Abbey. Lewis also sang several songs from the album whilst touring with Gary Barlow on his All The Hits Live Tour across November and December 2021. In November and December 2023, Lewis plans to headline a UK tour promoting the album, the tour billed as Christmas, with Love Tour. Initially announced for 2022, the concert tour was pushed back in May 2022 due to Lewis' pregnancy.

=== Singles ===
"One More Sleep" was released as the lead single from Christmas, with Love. Co-written by Lewis with Richard "Biff" Stannard, Iain James, Jez Ashurst and Bradford Ellis, it was produced by Stannard and Howes, with Lewis carrying out the vocal production alongside them. The song was released in the United States on 5 November 2013, and in Ireland and the United Kingdom on 29 November. Released to acclaim from music critics, "One More Sleep" debuted at number 34 on the UK Singles Chart , and surged to its peak position of number three the following week. It was eventually certified double platinum by the British Phonographic Industry (BPI) and has since become a "modern festive classic," particularly in the United Kingdom where it emerged as one of the most-streamed Christmas songs in the years following its release, with over 93 million streams as of 2021.

Apart from "One More Sleep," due to strong digital sales upon the release of Christmas, with Love in Ireland, Lewis' rendition of "O Holy Night" entered the Irish Singles Chart at number 86 for the week ending 14 December 2013, while her version of "Ave Maria" charted in the US, on Billboard's Holiday Digital Songs Sales chart at number 34. In support of the 2021 Christmas, with Love Always reissue, "Kiss Me It's Christmas" featuring American singer Ne-Yo was released in November 2021. Despite no promotion for the single, the song debuted on the UK Singles Chart at number 99, on the week commencing 31 December 2021.

== Critical reception ==
Professional ratings
Review scores
Source	Rating
AllMusic	3.5/5 stars
Female First	4/5 stars
The Gay UK	4/4 stars
The Guardian	2/5 stars
The Independent	2/4 stars
Knoxville.com	4/5 stars
So So Gay	(5.8/10)
Virgin Media	2/5 stars

The album received generally mixed to positive reviews from critics, with some praising Lewis for her vocals but not the material produced. AllMusic editor Stephen Thomas Erlewine gave the album three and a half out of five stars and called it "one of the best modern Christmas albums in memory." He found that Lewis "gets a greater chance to sing here than she did on her third album, Glassheart, which is reason enough to enjoy the album, but better still is that the Spector salute largely works." Renowned for Sound critic Janelle Tucknott remarked that "Lewis' beautiful voice delivers each song cheerfully with just the right amount of cheesiness." She called the album "a wonderfully festive collection and the perfect gift for any Leona Lewis fan, or essentially any fan of Christmas. Every track has lots of commercial appeal and will more than likely hit shopping mall sound systems very soon, especially the poppy lead single "One More Sleep"." Daniel Falconer from Female First wrote that with Christmas, with Love, Lewis is "absolutely encroaching on Mariah Carey vocal territory" and felt that "if this album proves anything, it's that her talent is still incomparable and that if you want anybody to be singing you Christmas songs, it should be Leona."

Alexis Petridis from The Guardian gave the album two out of five stars and praised its three original songs. He called "Your Hallelujah" a "spectral ballad," and said that "One More Sleep" and "Mr Right" were "enjoyable," but said that covers of songs such as "Christmas (Baby Please Come Home)" and "Winter Wonderland" were "tinged with a sense of pointlessness." Mark Sempill, writing for The Upcoming, felt that Lewis' "very beautiful, soulful, satiny voice wafts appealing through the various original songs and seasonal standards like a sweet scented candle; the result is adequately Christmassy." In a negative review, Andy Gill from The Independent write that "this dismal offering exemplifies the worst tendencies of Christmas albums." He found that he songs were "swathed in cathedral reverb, compounding the listless lack of imagination regarding material and treatment." In his review for Virgin Media, Ian Gittins called the album an "exercise in precision karaoke", and wrote that while Lewis "never misses a note," and that her new songs "out-Celine Celine", she "never stirs the soul." So So Gay critic Jamie Clarke wrote that "Lewis' Christmas effort lacks passion, fun and energy and ultimately disappoints."

== Commercial performance ==
In Ireland, Christmas, with Love debuted at number 45 on the Irish Albums Chart for the week ending 5 December 2013, and rose to number 36 the following week. In the United Kingdom, Music Week writer Paul Williams released a midweek chart reveal on 5 December stating that the album was currently at number 18 on the UK Albums Chart. Williams wrote that the album would be Lewis' lowest charting release to date, following Spirit, number one in 2007; Echo, number one in 2009; and Glassheart, number three in 2012. However, the album officially debuted at number 25 on the chart on 8 December, selling 9,000 copies, and at number 10 on the UK Digital Chart on the same day. In its second week, Christmas, With Love rose to number 13 on the UK Albums Chart, with a further 14,266 copies sold. Elsewhere in Europe, the album debuted at number 29 on the Scottish Albums Chart, and number 42 on the Swiss Album Chart. In the United States, Christmas, With Love debuted at 113 on the US Billboard 200 chart, and number 37 on the US Top Holiday Albums chart. By August 2015, the album had sold 23,000 copies in the US. In 2018, the Official Charts Company ranked Christmas, with Love 18th on its Official Top 20 biggest Christmas albums of the century listing, having sold 122,000 copies in the United Kingdom by December 2018.

== Track listing ==
All songs produced by Richard "Biff" Stannard and Ash Howes, with vocal production from Stannard, Howes and Leona Lewis.

Christmas, with Love (CD catalogue #B00G48OFXU)
No.	Title	Writer(s)	Length
1.	"One More Sleep"	Leona Lewis; Richard Stannard; Iain James; Jez Ashurst; Bradford Ellis	3:59
2.	"Winter Wonderland"	Felix Bernard; Dick Smith	2:24
3.	"White Christmas"	Irving Berlin	3:09
4.	"Your Hallelujah"	Leona Lewis; Jon Levine; Autumn Rowe; Lauren Christy	4:14
5.	"Christmas (Baby Please Come Home)"	Jeff Barry; Ellie Greenwich; Phil Spector	2:37
6.	"Mr Right"	Leona Lewis; Richard Stannard; Camille Purcell; Jez Ashurst; Ash Howes	3:14
7.	"O Holy Night"	Adolphe Adam	2:53
8.	"I Wish It Could Be Christmas Everyday"	Roy Wood	3:51
9.	"Ave Maria"	Franz Schubert; Walter Scott	4:00
10.	"Silent Night"	Franz Xaver Gruber; Joseph Mohr	2:19
Total length:			32:40

Christmas, with Love Always – Digital download
No.	Title	Writer(s)	Length
11.	"Kiss Me It’s Christmas" (featuring Ne-Yo)	Anya Jones; Biff Stannard; Iain James; Jez Ashurst	3:35
12.	"If I Can't Have You"	Barry Gibb; Maurice Gibb; Robin Gibb	4:00

Christmas, with Love Always – Vinyl
No.	Title	Writer(s)	Length
11.	"Kiss Me It’s Christmas" (featuring Iain James)	Jones; Stannard; James; Ashurst	3:36
12.	"If I Can't Have You"	B. Gibb; M. Gibb; R. Gibb	4:00

== Charts ==
=== Weekly charts ===
Weekly chart performance for Christmas, with Love
Chart (2013–2024)	Peak position
Dutch Albums (Album Top 100)	23
German Albums (Offizielle Top 100)	28
German Pop Albums (Offizielle Top 100)	19
Irish Albums (IRMA)	36
Latvian Albums (LaIPA)	69
Scottish Albums (OCC)	20
Swiss Albums (Schweizer Hitparade)	42
UK Albums (OCC)	13
US Billboard 200	113
US Holiday Albums (Billboard)	37

=== Year-end charts ===
Year-end chart performance for Christmas, with Love
Chart (2013)	Position
UK Albums (OCC)	88

== Certifications ==
Certifications for Christmas, with Love
Region	Certification	Certified units/sales
United Kingdom (BPI)	Gold	122,000

== Release history ==
Release dates and formats for Christmas, with Love
Region	Date	Edition(s)	Format(s)	Label	Ref.
Germany	29 November 2013	Standard	CD; digital download	Sony	
Ireland	29 November 2013	Standard	CD; digital download	Sony	
Switzerland	29 November 2013	Standard	CD; digital download	Sony	
United Kingdom	2 December 2013	Standard	CD; digital download	Syco	
Canada	3 December 2013	Standard	CD; digital download	RCA	
Italy	3 December 2013	Standard	CD; digital download	Sony	
United States	3 December 2013	Standard	CD; digital download	RCA	
Various	19 November 2021	Christmas, with Love Always reissue	LP; digital download	Sony	
