= Radio 1's Live Lounge – Volume 6 =

BBC Radio 1's Live Lounge – Volume 6

Compilation album by various artists
- Released: 31 October 2011
- Genre: Various
- Label: Sony, Rhino, Universal TV
- Producer: Various

Live Lounge chronology
The Best of BBC Radio 1's Live Lounge (2011)	BBC Radio 1's Live Lounge – Volume 6 (2011)	BBC Radio 1's Live Lounge 2012 (2012)

Radio 1's Live Lounge – Volume 6 is a compilation album consisting of live tracks played on Fearne Cotton's BBC Radio 1 show, both cover versions and original songs. The album was released on 31 October 2011, and is the seventh in the series of Live Lounge albums.

== Track listing ==
Disc 1
No.	Title	Artist	Length
1.	"The A Team"	Ed Sheeran
2.	"The Edge of Glory" (originally by Lady Gaga)	Friendly Fires
3.	"Price Tag"	Jessie J
4.	"Don't Sit Down 'Cause I've Moved Your Chair" (originally by Arctic Monkeys)	Example
5.	"Life is Life"	Noah and the Whale
6.	"Heaven" (originally by Emeli Sandé)	Miles Kane
7.	"Unorthodox"	Wretch 32 featuring Example
8.	"Last Friday Night (T.G.I.F.)" (originally by Katy Perry)	The Vaccines
9.	"Fight for This Love" (originally by Cheryl Cole)	Vampire Weekend
10.	"Louder"	DJ Fresh
11.	"The Bug"	Magnetic Man
12.	"Sweat" (originally by Snoop Dogg vs. David Guetta)	Hard-Fi
13.	"Live Those Days Tonight" (originally by Friendly Fires)	Nero
14.	"All of the Lights" (originally by Kanye West)	Skepta
15.	"A Change Is Gonna Come" (originally by Sam Cooke)	Maverick Sabre
16.	"I Need a Dollar" (originally by Aloe Blacc)	The Saturdays
17.	"In The Air"	Chipmunk Feat. Keri Hilson
18.	"Let It Go"	Devlin
19.	"Grenade" (originally by Bruno Mars)	Alexis Jordan
20.	"Only Girl (In the World)" (originally by Rihanna)	Ellie Goulding

Disc 2
No.	Title	Artist	Length
1.	"I Need a Dollar"	Aloe Blacc
2.	"Let Me Go" (originally by Maverick Sabre)	Katy B
3.	"Gold Forever"	The Wanted
4.	"Rolling in the Deep"	Adele
5.	"Shelter" (originally by The xx)	Birdy
6.	"Love Goes Down"	Plan B
7.	"Let the Sun Shine" (originally by Labrinth)	Leona Lewis
8.	"Like a G6" (originally by Far East Movement)	Diddy – Dirty Money
9.	"We Used to Wait" (originally by Arcade Fire)	Mark Ronson & The Business Intl.
10.	"Do It Like a Dude" (originally by Jessie J)	Talay Riley
11.	"Anti-D"	The Wombats
12.	"Pumped Up Kicks" (originally by Foster the People)	The Kooks
13.	"Just Tonight"	The Pretty Reckless
14.	"Hold It Against Me" (originally by Britney Spears)	Taio Cruz
15.	"Every Teardrop Is a Waterfall" (originally by Coldplay)	Robyn
16.	"What's My Name?" (originally by Rihanna)	Everything Everything
17.	"Something Good Can Work"	Two Door Cinema Club
18.	"Becoming a Jackal"	Villagers
19.	"Tik Tok" (originally by Kesha)	Avril Lavigne
20.	"The Flood"	Take That

== Charts ==
Chart (2011)	Peak position
UK Compilation Albums Chart	1
