= The Best of BBC Radio 1's Live Lounge =

2011 compilation album

Compilation album by Various
- Released: 6 June 2011
- Length: 154:34
- Label: CMG
- Producer: Various

Live Lounge chronology
Radio 1's Live Lounge – Volume 5 (2010)	The Best of BBC Radio 1's Live Lounge (2011)	Radio 1's Live Lounge – Volume 6 (2011)

The Best of BBC Radio 1's Live Lounge is a collection of live tracks played on Jo Whiley's and Fearne Cotton's Radio 1 shows. It consists of both covers and the bands' own songs. It consisted of tracks previously available on past Live Lounge compilation albums, as well as one that was previously unavailable.

The second disc is over 80 minutes long making it exceed the length of almost all compact discs.

The booklet gives a history on the series.

== Track listing ==
Disc 1
No.	Title	Artist	Length
1.	"Chasing Pavements"	Adele
2.	"Love Machine" (originally by Girls Aloud)	Arctic Monkeys
3.	"Fans"	Kings of Leon
4.	"Poker Face"	Lady Gaga
5.	"Pass Out" (originally by Tinie Tempah)	Plan B
6.	"Hate That I Love You"	Rihanna
7.	"That's Not My Name" (originally by The Ting Tings)	Dizzee Rascal
8.	"Boom Boom Pow"	The Black Eyed Peas
9.	"She Said" (originally by Plan B)	Jason Derülo
10.	"Little Lion Man" (originally by Mumford & Sons)	Taio Cruz
11.	"Ready for the Weekend"	Calvin Harris
12.	"Dirrty / licious" (originally by Christina Aguilera/Destiny's Child)	Keane
13.	"The Man Who Can't Be Moved / Breakeven" (originally by The Script)	N-Dubz
14.	"I Kissed a Girl" (originally by Katy Perry)	McFly
15.	"Since U Been Gone"	Kelly Clarkson
16.	"Sexy Chick" (originally by David Guetta feat. Akon)	Paloma Faith
17.	"Wonderful Life" (originally by Hurts)	Kylie Minogue
18.	"Beautiful Day"	U2
19.	"Songbird"	Oasis
20.	"One Day Like This"	Elbow

Disc 2
No.	Title	Artist	Length
1.	"Times Like These"	Foo Fighters
2.	"The Cave"	Mumford & Sons
3.	"Valerie" (originally by The Zutons)	Amy Winehouse
4.	"Frisky"	Tinie Tempah
5.	"Smile"	Lily Allen
6.	"Lose Yourself" (originally by Eminem)	The Script
7.	"Rehab" (originally by Amy Winehouse)	Paolo Nutini
8.	"Many of Horror"	Biffy Clyro
9.	"Halo" (originally by Beyoncé)	Florence + the Machine
10.	"Violet Hill" (originally by Coldplay)	Pendulum
11.	"LSF"	Kasabian
12.	"Love's Not a Competition (But I'm Winning)" (originally by Kaiser Chiefs)	Paramore
13.	"Family Portrait"	P!nk
14.	"Numb" (originally by Linkin Park)	Jamelia
15.	"Standing in the Way of Control" (originally by The Gossip)	The Ting Tings
16.	"Stop Me" (originally by The Smiths)	Mark Ronson feat. Daniel Merriweather
17.	"Billionaire"	Travie McCoy
18.	"Frontin'" (originally by Pharrell feat. Jay-Z)	Jamie Cullum
19.	"Hey Ya!" (originally by Outkast)	Will Young
20.	"Run" (originally by Snow Patrol)	Leona Lewis
