= One More Sleep =

2013 single by Leona Lewis

Single by Leona Lewis

from the album Christmas, with Love
- Released: 5 November 2013
- Recorded: 2013
- Studio: Biffco Studios (Brighton); Angel Recording (London)
- Genre: Christmas
- Length: 3:59
- Label: RCA; Syco
- Songwriters: Leona Lewis; Richard "Biff" Stannard; Iain James; Jez Ashurst; Bradford Ellis
- Producers: Stannard; Ash Howes

Leona Lewis singles chronology
"Lovebird" (2012)	"One More Sleep" (2013)	"Fire Under My Feet" (2015)

Music video
- "One More Sleep" on YouTube

"One More Sleep" is a song recorded by British singer Leona Lewis. It was released as the lead single from her first Christmas album and fourth studio album, Christmas, with Love (2013), on 5 November 2013 through RCA Records and Syco Music. The song was written by Lewis in collaboration with Richard "Biff" Stannard, Iain James, Jez Ashurst and Bradford Ellis, and was produced by Richard "Biff" Stannard. "One More Sleep" is a Motown-inspired christmas song, which lyrically consists of Lewis counting down the days until she can be with her lover on Christmas day. The track garnered critical acclaim, with many critics considering it to be one of the best Christmas songs of all time. In 2025, Billboard ranked "One More Sleep" 12th on their "Best New Christmas Songs of the 21st Century" list.

Commercially, "One More Sleep" achieved success, reaching number three on both the UK Singles Chart and Scottish Singles Chart in December 2013. It has appeared on the UK Singles Chart every year since its release. The song has been certified triple platinum by the British Phonographic Industry (BPI), denoting sales of 1.8 million copies in the country. Elsewhere, the track has placed on numerous record charts worldwide, reaching the top twenty in Ireland, and the top sixty in the Netherlands and Switzerland; additionally it has been certified Gold in Denmark and New Zealand, respectively. In 2025, the Official Charts Company named "One More Sleep" as the biggest Christmas song released in the 21st Century in the UK, with the track garnering over 190 million streams. Additionally, that same year the song was announced by the Phonographic Performance Limited (PPL) as being the most played modern Christmas track on UK radio stations.

Lewis' promoted "One More Sleep" through televised performances on shows including the season finales of both The X Factor UK and The X Factor US, and at the 81st Rockefeller Center Christmas Tree Lighting ceremony in New York, in December 2013. Most recently, she performed the song as part of her Las Vegas residency, A Starry Night, between 2025 and 2026.

== Background ==
Simon Cowell (pictured) came up with the idea for Lewis to record a Christmas album.

In February 2013, a representative from Syco Music, Lewis' record label, announced that she was about to start writing and recording material "imminently" for her fourth studio album, and that it would be released in late 2013. The news came after Lewis announced that she had parted ways from Modest! Management, the management team who had represented her since she won the third series of The X Factor in 2006. Various media outlets speculated that this was due to the weak commercial performance of her third studio album, Glassheart, which was released in November 2012. It became her first album to not debut at number one or earn platinum certification in the United Kingdom. It was also reported that the second single from the album, "Lovebird", had sold fewer than 600 copies, meaning that it failed to attain one of 200 chart positions on the UK Singles Chart, and this was another contributing factor to her departure.

In June 2013, speculation arose that Lewis' fourth album would in fact be a Christmas album, after British production duo MagicIT tweeted that they were in a studio recording Christmas songs with the singer. The following month, Lewis confirmed that she was indeed in the process of recording a Christmas album. She revealed that it was recorded on the recommendation of Syco boss Simon Cowell. Speaking in July 2013 about the decision to record a Christmas album at this point in her career, Lewis further explained how Cowell had come up with the idea: "Simon is still very much involved in my career and helps me out. He came up with the Christmas album idea, and we both kind of felt it was the right time to go ahead with it."

== Release ==
On 24 October 2013, Lewis unveiled "One More Sleep" as the album's lead single, and she released the single cover artwork a week later, on 31 October. The artwork is a head shot of Lewis holding a red bow over her left eye. The song was released as a digital download in the United States on 5 November through RCA Records, Ireland, Italy and Switzerland through Sony Music Entertainment and the United Kingdom through Syco Music on 29 November, and multiple other European countries on 2 December, including France and Spain. Lewis uploaded a Cahill remix of the song to her official SoundCloud account on 21 November 2013.

== Production and composition ==
"One More Sleep" was co-written by Lewis in collaboration with Richard "Biff" Stannard, Iain James, Jez Ashurst and Bradford Ellis. Stannard and Ash Howes produced the song, while they and Lewis carried out the vocal production. It was recorded by Biffco and mixed by Howes at Biffco Studios, Brighton, and Angel Recording Studios, London. The song utilised a multitude of instrumentalists: Keys and programming were performed by Ashurst, Stannard and Howes; Celli by Nick Holland; drums by Freddy Sheed and bass by Knight Time Horns; trombone by Barnaby Dickinson and trumpet by Graeme Flowers; James Knight performed the saxophone; strings were led by Rolf Wilson, arranged and conducted by Cliff Masterson and booked by Roz Colls; Rolf Wilson, Simon Baggs, Steve Morris, Julian Leaper, Tom Piggot Smith, Richard George, Jonathan Hill, Laura Bruce White, Tim Grant, Reiad Chibah performed the violins; and violas by Greg Walmsley, Nerys Richards. Background vocals were sung by Katie Holmes, Kelli-Leigh Henry-Davila and Bianca Claxton, while Choir vocals were performed by Diva singers, who were arranged and conducted by Masterson.

"One More Sleep" is a Motown inspired song which lasts for a duration of 3:59. The hook consists of a Christmas countdown, whereby Lewis sings "Cause I got five more nights of sleeping on my own/ Four more days until you’re coming home/ Three more dreams of you and mistletoe/ Two more reasons why I love you so." Lewis "trills" the lyrics "I've got five more nights of sleeping on my own/ Four more days until you're coming home" over the Motown inspired beat of xylophone phones and jingle bells. Waiting the return of her partner to come home on Christmas Day, Lewis adopts an "angelic tone" as she sings "Three more dreams of you and mistletoe/ Two more reasons why I love you so." Popjustice praised the "5-4-3-2-1 device", calling it "excellent."

== Critical reception ==
"One More Sleep" garnered acclaim from music critics. It has been included on many critics' lists of the best Christmas songs of all time. In 2024 Billboard ranked the song 18th on the "Best New Christmas Songs of the 21st Century" list. In 2025, Billboard picked the song 12th on "The 30 Best Christmas Songs of the 21st Century (So Far): Staff Picks" list.

Writing for Digital Spy, Lewis Corner wrote that "One More Sleep" is more "heart-warming" and "sweet" than a Christmas pudding, and that is likely to become an annual Christmas staple song. He awarded the song four out of a possible five stars. Sam Lanksy of Idolator wrote that the song is "wonderfully old-fashioned", with "ooh-oohs" sung in the background and "twinkly" production. Lanksy continued to write that if "One More Sleep" fails to get listeners in the mood for Christmas, then "nothing" else would. Popjustice wrote that "One More Sleep" is "so incredible" that listeners forget that it is one of "the most toxic phrases in the English language", and awarded the song nine out of a possible ten stars. Michael Cragg, a writer for The Guardian, was complimentary of the song and wrote that it is worthy of ranking alongside Kelly Clarkson's Christmas song "Underneath the Tree" (Wrapped in Red) as 2013's "best song to get drunk to at a Christmas party." He praised the decision for "legendary" producer Richard Stannard to produce the song, as well as the Spector influence.

== Chart performance ==
=== United Kingdom ===
In the United Kingdom, "One More Sleep" debuted at number 34 on the UK Singles Chart on 8 December 2013, and rose to its peak position of number three the following week. Only 300 copies separated "One More Sleep" from attaining the number-two position, which was claimed by Avicii's "Hey Brother". With "One More Sleep" peaking inside the top five on the UK Singles Chart, Lewis set a new record for British female solo artist with the most top five singles in the history of the chart, bringing her total to eight. She achieved her first top five single "A Moment Like This" in 2006, which peaked at number one, and her most recent until "One More Sleep" was "Collide" in 2011, which peaked at number four. As a result, Lewis overtook Olivia Newton-John's record tally of seven top five singles. The following week, the song held onto its peak position of number three, before falling to number 15 in its fourth week. The track departed the UK Singles Chart in its fifth week. On the UK Singles Downloads Chart, "One More Sleep" debuted at number 36 on 8 December 2013, and jumped to number two the following week. It slipped one position to number three in its third week, and number 14 in its fourth before falling off the chart altogether. In December 2014, the song re-entered the UK Singles Chart at number 80, and spent a further week at number 92. In December 2015, it re-entered the chart for one week at number 83. The song has re-entered the UK Singles Chart every year since its release during the Christmas period, attaining its highest position since 2013 in December 2018, when it reached number 8. Its most recent entry was in December 2025, when it peaked at number 32, an improvement over its number 34 peak the prior year. In total, "One More Sleep" has spent a total of 54 weeks on the UK charts, and is Lewis' longest charting song in the country. In December 2021, "One More Sleep" surpassed 1,000,000 equivalent units in the UK, and in 2024 it was certified triple platinum. "One More Sleep" is the fourth biggest Christmas song of the 21st century in the United Kingdom, having sold over 1.46 million units. In 2024, One More Sleep was recognised as the most played modern Christmas song of the 21st century in the country.

=== International ===
For the week ending 7 December 2013, "One More Sleep" debuted at number 31 on the South Korea International Singles Charts, with first week sales of 4,266 copies. In the United States, the song debuted at number 16 on the Billboard Adult Contemporary chart on 9 December. It rose one position to number 15 in its second week, and to number 10 in its third week. It peaked at number 23 on the US Holiday Digital Songs chart. In Ireland, "One More Sleep" peaked at number 19.

== Music video ==
The official music video for "One More Sleep" was uploaded to Leona's official VEVO account on 30 November 2013. Lewis's boyfriend Dennis Jauch appears in the video. Lewis said the video "came from an idea we did a little while ago where a camera crew came into the studio and shot me and my friend just kinda messing around and just in the studio being me". Michael Cragg from The Guardian wrote that it does not matter what happens in the music video, as he believes that no Christmas single has ever had a good video. However, he further wrote that Lewis had "ripped off" Wham!'s music video for "Last Christmas".

== Live performances ==
Lewis embarked on a promotional tour across Europe prior to the album's release. On 9 November 2013, Lewis performed "One More Sleep" and "White Christmas" for the first time at the Regent Street Christmas lights switch-on event in London, England. Other musical performers included Passenger and Eliza Doolittle. On 22 November, Lewis gave a free concert in Zurich, Switzerland, at the NRJ Energy Stars for Free Festival in front of audience of 13,000 people. The following evening, Lewis performed a short set at London's G-A-Y nightclub.

In the United States, Lewis appeared on NBC's The Today Show on 4 December in New York City to talk about the album. On the same day, she performed at the Rockefeller Center Christmas Tree lighting event, where she performed "White Christmas", "One More Sleep" and "I Wish It Could Be Christmas Everyday". The following day on 5 December, Lewis made an appearance on Live! with Kelly and Michael. Lewis performed "One More Sleep" live at the semi-finals of the tenth series of The X Factor on 8 December and again on This Morning on 13 December. Leona performed "I Wish It Could be Christmas Everyday" on The Jonathan Ross Show and "One More Sleep" at ITV's Daybreak. Lewis performed at The Tonight Show with Jay Leno, Billboard Studio Sessions and on The Today Show on 25 December. Also in the US, Leona appeared in NBA Promo for ABC and ESPN.

On 2 December 2018, Lewis joined Scarlet Lee to perform "One More Sleep", which would have been Scarlet's winner's song if she had won.

In 2023, Lewis performed the song on her Christmas with Love Tour.

== Formats and versions ==
Single release version

1. "One More Sleep" – 3:59

Streaming – Dance Remix

1. "One More Sleep" (Cahill Remix) – 3:47

Remixes – EP

1. "One More Sleep" – 4:01
2. "One More Sleep" (Instrumental) – 3:58
3. "One More Sleep" (Cahill Club Mix) – 6:07
4. "One More Sleep" (Cahill Radio Edit) – 3:47

== Credits and personnel ==
Recording

- Recorded and mixed at Biffco Studios, Brighton, and Angel Recording Studios, London.

Personnel

- Songwriting – Leona Lewis, Richard Stannard, Iain James, Jez Ashurst, Bradford Ellis
- Production – Richard "Biff" Stannard, Ash Howes
- Vocal production – Richard Stannard, Ash Howes, Leona Lewis
- Mixing – Richard Stannard
- Recording – Biffco, Ash Howes
- Keys and programming – Jez Ashurst, Richard Stannard, Ash Howes
- Celli – Nick Holland
- Drums – Freddy Sheed
- Brass – Knight Time Horns
- Trombone – Barnaby Dickinson
- Trumpet – Graeme Flowers
- Saxophone – James Knight
- Strings – Led by Rolf Wilson, arranged and conducted by Cliff Masterson, booked by Roz Colls
- Violins – Rolf Wilson, Simon Baggs, Steve Morris, Julian Leaper, Tom Piggot Smith, Richard George, Jonathan Hill, Laura Bruce White, Tim Grant, Reiad Chibah.
- Violas – Greg Walmsley, Nerys Richards.
- Background vocals – Katie Holmes, Kelli-Leigh Henry-Davila, Bianca Claxton
- Choir vocals – Diva singers (arranged and conducted by Cliff Masterson)

Credits adapted from the liner notes of Christmas, with Love. (Syco, Sony, RCA).

== Charts ==
=== Weekly charts ===
Chart (2013–2014)	Peak position
Belgium (Ultratip Bubbling Under Flanders)	83
Canada Hot 100 (Billboard)	92
Canada AC (Billboard)	2
Ireland (IRMA)	19
Scotland (Official Charts Company)	3
South Korea International (Gaon)	31
UK Singles (OCC)	3
US Adult Contemporary (Billboard)	10
US Holiday Digital Songs (Billboard)	23

Chart (2015–2026)	Peak position
Australia (ARIA)	98
Austria (Ö3 Austria Top 40)	68
Estonia Airplay (TopHit)	65
Germany (GfK)	76
Global 200 (Billboard)	99
Hungary (Rádiós Top 40)	28
Ireland (IRMA)	30
Lithuania (AGATA)	87
Netherlands (Dutch Single Tip) Acoustic	2
Netherlands (Single Top 100)	58
Romania Airplay (TopHit)	100
Scotland (Official Charts Company)	12
Switzerland (Schweizer Hitparade)	54
UK Singles (OCC)	8

=== Year-end charts ===
Chart (2013)	Position
UK Singles (OCC)	156

== Certifications ==
Region	Certification	Certified units/sales
Denmark (IFPI Danmark)	Gold	45,000^{‡}
New Zealand (RMNZ)	Gold	15,000^{‡}
United Kingdom (BPI)	3× Platinum	1,800,000^{‡}
^{‡} Sales+streaming figures based on certification alone.
