= Echo (Leona Lewis album) =

Studio album by Leona Lewis
- Released: 9 November 2009
- Recorded: January–September 2009
- Studios: Abbey Road (London); Chalice (Hollywood); CMK Studios (Los Angeles); Conway (Los Angeles); Dean Street Studios (London); Germano (New York City); Henson (Hollywood); Maratone (Stockholm); Mason Sound (North Hollywood); Park Hill Studios (Denver); The Rabbit Hole (Calabasas); RAK (London); Sphere Studios (London); The Vault (Stockholm); Westlake (Los Angeles)
- Genres: Europop; R&B
- Length: 59:03
- Label: Syco
- Producers: Jeff Bhasker; Arnthor Birgisson; Julian Bunetta; Mike Elizondo; Andrew Frampton; Kristian Lundin; Uriel Kadouch; Max Martin; Harvey Mason, Jr.; Steve Robson; Kevin Rudolf; John Shanks; Shellback; Ryan Tedder; The Y's; Rob Knox

Leona Lewis chronology
Spirit (2007)	Echo (2009)	The Labyrinth Tour: Live from the O2 (2010)

Singles from Echo
- 1. "Happy" Released: 15 September 2009; 2. "I Got You" Released: 1 November 2009

Echo is the second studio album by British singer Leona Lewis. It was released on 9 November 2009 including 16 November in the United Kingdom, and 17 November 2009 in the United States. Its worldwide release was through Sony Music. The album charted across the globe, including the US, UK, Canada, across Europe, Mexico, Australia and New Zealand, with commercial success.

Lewis worked with Ryan Tedder, Justin Timberlake, Max Martin, John Shanks, and Harvey Mason, Jr. amongst others to produce the follow-up to her debut album Spirit. The album was preceded by the single "Happy", released on 15 September 2009. "I Got You" was released as the second single in February 2010. The song "My Hands" was used as the theme song for the video game Final Fantasy XIII. The album achieved commercial success, peaking within the top twenty in nine countries, including debuting at number one in the UK with 161,000 copies sold in its first week. Lewis promoted the album along with her debut record on The Labyrinth, her debut headlining concert tour, starting in May 2010.

== Background and production ==
As with Lewis's debut album, Spirit, each of Echo's producers were enlisted by her mentors Simon Cowell and Clive Davis. Unlike her debut album where she travelled between cities, Lewis remained in Los Angeles for the recording of Echo, which took nine months to produce. It contains ballads, racier tracks and dancefloor anthems. Lewis titled the album Echo "since an echo describes a big, organic sound," and it appealed to her love of fantasy as Echo was a nymph who, in Greek mythology, "pined away till only her voice remained." In August 2009 Lewis told her official website: "I'm in the midst of the recording process, working with incredible songwriters and producers, and my music has really evolved. It's so exciting to create something new." She also said, "I'm actually more confident with this album than the last. I've taken more control this time and I feel more at ease with everything." She told Variety magazine that she "wanted the album to have a little bit more of a live feel to it, with a little more live instrumentation," and described Echo as "more guitar-driven" compared to Spirit, with a "harder edge" in an interview with Seventeen.

Lewis worked with Ryan Tedder, producer of her second single "Bleeding Love", on the album's lead single "Happy", written by Lewis, Tedder and Evan Bogart, and "You Don't Care". Tedder commented, "I pushed [Lewis] vocally more on this song than any song she's ever done. I mean, she did some stuff on "Happy" that's awesome, but this other song she takes it to another level." The song "Lost Then Found" was also co-written by Tedder and Lewis along with Dan Muckala, Jess Cates and Lindy Robbins, and features Tedder's band OneRepublic. Another Tedder song, "Shadows", was written with AJ McLean for the Backstreet Boys. After it failed to make the Backstreet Boys' album, Cowell wanted it for Lewis but then decided it better suited Westlife.

Justin Timberlake contributed production and backing vocals to several songs, including "Don't Let Me Down", written and produced with Timberlake's production team The Y's and recorded at Chalice Recording Studios. Arnthor Birgisson worked with Lewis on the songs "My Hands" and "Heartbeat", which were written by Ina Wroldsen and Birgisson. "My Hands" features on Echo, while "Heartbeat" is the B-side for the album's second single. Max Martin and Birgisson worked with Lewis on the song "I Got You" with Martin also contributing to the dance track "Outta My Head" written by Martin, Johan Karl Schuster and Kotecha. Schuster also produced the upbeat "Naked" along with Kristian Lundin. It was written by Lewis, Lundin and Kotecha.

John Shanks produced two songs, a ballad and an uptempo song, one of which is "Broken", written by Shanks, Novel and Lewis. Julian Bunetta worked with Lewis along with Andrew Frampton to produce "Brave", which was written by Frampton, Bunetta, Kotecha and Lewis. Kevin Rudolf produced "Love Letter", which he co-wrote with J. Kasher. In September 2009, Lewis worked with Harvey Mason, Jr., Uriel Kadouch, Keith Ross, and Gavriel Aminov to produce "Can't Breathe". The album also contains a cover of Oasis's "Stop Crying Your Heart Out", which was produced by Steve Robson.

Lewis also worked with several writers and producers on songs that failed to make the album. Toby Gad worked with Lewis including writing the song "Unreachable" with Lewis and Robbins. Taio Cruz was hired by Cowell to write and produce tracks for the album, and Irish Indie band The Script agreed to write a song, however, it was submitted too late. Production and songwriting team Xenomania were reported to have written five songs for Lewis's second album, described by songwriter Miranda Cooper as "tragic songs with a twist." Ne-Yo wrote songs for the album, including "Can't Fight It". Lewis expressed interest in working with Chris Martin of Coldplay to give the album a rockier edge, though a collaboration never came to light. Lewis collaborated with rock singer Aqualung. She was also reported to have worked with DJ Infamous, Claude Kelly, and Los Da Mystro. She worked with Timbaland in April 2009, and explained the reason for his tracks not appearing on Echo: "I went in the studio with Timbaland and we vibed out. The thing is, on this album, there were a lot of people that I'd been with on the first album so I knew them and we kinda got into the vibe straight away. Obviously I'm still getting to know Timbaland, it's kind of a continuing and evolving relationship, so this time he's not on the album, but hopefully next time he will be".

The album was released in two formats. In addition to the standard edition, albums downloaded from iTunes receive two live performance songs. The two live songs, "Brave" and "The First Time Ever I Saw Your Face", were recorded at a concert at London's Hackney Empire on 2 November 2009. In July 2010 it was reported by the Sunday Mirror that a deluxe edition is planned for release.

=== Theft of demo and unauthorised leaks ===
In August 2009, several of the album's unfinished songs leaked onto the internet and it is believed that computers at Lewis's record label were hacked into. An investigation was launched by the International Federation of the Phonographic Industry (IFPI), working with the record label and police to identify those responsible. Lewis confirmed during an interview with an Australian radio station that some of the songs that leaked would be included on the album. At the end of March 2010 it was reported that Syco Music had suffered once again from computer hackers who obtained 14 previously unreleased songs by Lewis and subsequently leaked them online. It was also revealed that Cowell had contacted the FBI regarding the matter, while British police were contacted to investigate the leak of Echo in November 2009 before it was officially released. It was later revealed in 2011 that songs recorded for Echo were targeted by the German hacker, Deniz A., also known as DJ Stolen. In July 2010, the Rasch law firm logged a criminal complaint against DJ Stolen for "constantly placing hacked songs on the internet". Amongst those songs listed in the complaint was one called "Pulse", described at the time as a new recording by Lewis. DJ Stolen was jailed for 18 months in June 2011.

== Artwork ==
In an interview with Seventeen magazine, Lewis described the album's packaging and design as having a desert setting. Each of Lewis's outfits, described as "modern, 'heroine' gowns", was designed by Vivienne Westwood. Each gown was made-to-measure in Westwood's central London atelier. They are created in gold lamé and white satin, are fitted around a boned leotard and feature the designer's signature cleavage-enhancing corset, with a crinoline-style skirt. One costume depicts Lewis as a mermaid, an idea that Lewis suggested. Lewis also wears Westwood's dresses in her music videos and during promotional events for the album and singles.

== Promotion ==
Lewis was scheduled to appear on the BBC's The One Show on 14 October 2009, but she pulled out following an incident at a booksigning of her autobiography Dreams where a man punched her in the face. She also cancelled a two-day promotional trip to Germany. She rescheduled her appearance on The One Show to 26 October. Lewis performed an exclusive live show at the Hackney Empire in London on 2 November 2009, her first full UK show, where she performed nine songs in total, including four from Echo. On 5 November 2009 she has also performed "Happy" at the MTV Europe Music Awards 2009 held in Berlin, Germany. Lewis performed again on The X Factor final, on 13 December, singing her rendition of "Stop Crying Your Heart Out". Following this performance, the song charted at 29 in the UK singles charts from strong downloads. On 3 December 2009, Lewis performed "Happy", "I Got You" and "Stop Crying Your Heart Out", as well as two songs from Spirit, on the BBC Radio 2 show Live Sessions with Ken Bruce. She also performed "I Got You" and "Stop Crying Your Heart Out" on BBC Radio 1's Live Lounge.

=== Tour ===
Lewis started her debut tour, The Labyrinth, in May 2010, supporting Spirit and Echo with dates in the United Kingdom and Republic of Ireland.

=== Singles ===
"Happy", the first single from the album, was released to download in the United States and Canada in September 2009, and worldwide in November 2009. It reached number 31 on the US Billboard Hot 100, and number 15 on the Canadian Hot 100. In the Australian ARIA Singles Chart it reached number 26. In Billboard's Japan Hot 100 it reached number 7. It also charted in the Dutch Single Top 100 at number 74 and in New Zealand at 35. "Happy" entered the UK chart at number 2 and was certified Silver (200,000+). "I Got You" was released as the second and final single in the UK on 21 February 2010 and peaked at number 14 on the UK Singles Chart and number 3 on the UK R&B Chart.

=== Other songs ===
Although not released as a single, "Stop Crying Your Heart Out", a cover of an Oasis song, charted at number 29 on the UK Singles Chart in late 2009, following Lewis's live performance on The X Factor. The track "My Hands" was chosen as the theme song for the video game Final Fantasy XIII's release in North America and Europe.

== Critical reception ==
Professional ratings
Aggregate scores
Source	Rating
Metacritic	(59/100)
Review scores
Source	Rating
Allmusic	3.5/5 stars
Billboard	(favorable)
The Boston Globe	(favorable)
Entertainment Weekly	C+
The Guardian	3/5 stars
The Independent	(mixed)
MusicOMH	2/5 stars
The New York Times	(favorable)
The Observer	3/5 stars
Rolling Stone	2.5/5 stars
Slant	2.5/5 stars
The Times	4/5 stars
Yahoo! Music UK	7/10 stars

Critical response to the album has been mixed, based on a score of 59 out of 100 from review aggregator site Metacritic. The Observer's review of Echo gave the album three out of five stars, with reviewer Peter Robinson writing, "Unusually for an X Factor graduate, there was actually something at risk if the second album didn't work, but Echo hits its target. A handful of upbeat numbers – including an unexpected foray into frothy high-speed electro – pull Leona back from the brink of boring." Jim Farber of the New York Daily News agreed, writing "Echo has a sense of fun, and a youthful vim, rarely on display on Spirit. It's faster, harder and way catchier." Neil McCormick, writing in The Daily Telegraph, said Lewis's "mezzo-soprano range allows her to take melodies from luxurious low notes to high-flying falsetto, gliding with elegant power and impressive control through all kinds of fluctuations and modulations. [...] The approach of the album's producers is to throw Leona at a song, with multi-tracked vocals shooting off in every direction, until you feel like you're listening to a room full of cloned divas fighting over who gets the top line. It's an exhausting yet strangely exhilarating experience." Heat's Karen Edwards awarded the album five stars out of five, saying "From girlie pop to big ballads, this album will remind you what the fuss is all about. Future X Factor winners take note: this is what real talent sounds like."

On the other hand, some reviews were more critical: Entertainment Weekly said that "Too much of "Echo" is mired in soppy balladry and standard-issue dancery", adding that "When it works, however, as on the soaring 'Happy' and feathery, synth-laden 'I Got You,' all is (momentarily) redeemed". The Guardian said that "Echo's 13 tracks, which were co-written by Justin Timberlake, OneRepublic's Ryan Tedder and other costly names, follow the formula of her debut: the slow, piano-accented build-up, punctuated by sharp intakes of breath and vocal curlicues, then the climactic explosion as the drums crash in and she hits the chorus. That voice is impressive enough and there's no denying the stolid catchiness of some songs – notably Happy and her cover of Oasis's Stop Crying Your Heart Out – but she appears to lack the lightness of touch this album desperately needs". Slant Magazine stated that "...less compelling material, particularly in the album's second half, finds Lewis's talent squandered. The gooier adult contemporary numbers, of which 'I Got You' is the worst, tend to add a lot of unnecessary vocal doctoring to the mix, edging on the faceless robo-pop that has become all too ubiquitous in the age of Auto-Tune. And too much of the album's runtime is dominated by altogether thoughtless ballads, like the languid late-album duo of 'Stop Crying Your Heart Out' and 'Don't Let Me Down,' in which Lewis confronts dull, piano-driven arrangements with vocals that, while technically unimpeachable, lack any warmth or emotional expression".

== Commercial performance ==
Echo made its first chart appearance on the Irish Albums Chart at number two. In Belgium the album charted at 69 on the Flanders Album Chart and 67 on the Wallonia albums chart. Echo debuted at Number 1 on the UK Album Charts on 22 November selling 161,000 copies and has since been certified double platinum in the UK. In the United States, the album debuted at number 13 on the US Billboard 200 with over 69,000 units sold. but in the second week sales fell by 68% to just 21,431.

== Track listing ==
Echo tracklisting
No.	Title	Writer(s)	Producer(s)	Length
1.	"Happy"	E. Kidd Bogart; Leona Lewis; Ryan Tedder	Tedder	4:02
2.	"I Got You"	Arnthor Birgisson; Savan Kotecha; Max Martin	Birgisson	3:46
3.	"Can't Breathe"	Gavriel Aminov; Uriel "Frenchie" Kadouch; Lundon J. Knighten; Lewis; Cheryline Lim; Michael Malih; Keith Ross	Kadouch; Vein; Harvey Mason, Jr.^{[a]}	4:14
4.	"Brave"	Julian Bunetta; Andrew Frampton; Kotecha; Lewis	Bunetta; Frampton	3:37
5.	"Outta My Head"	Kotecha; Martin; Shellback	Martin; Shellback	3:39
6.	"My Hands"	Birgisson; Ina Wroldsen	Birgisson	4:12
7.	"Love Letter"	Jacob Kasher; Kevin Rudolf	Rudolf	4:01
8.	"Broken"	Lewis; Alonzo "Novel" Stevenson; John Shanks	Shanks	4:03
9.	"Naked"	Kotecha; Lewis; Kristian Lundin	Lundin; Shellback	3:50
10.	"Stop Crying Your Heart Out"	Noel Gallagher	Steve Robson; Lewis	4:09
11.	"Don't Let Me Down"	Mike Elizondo; James Fauntleroy II; Lewis; Justin Timberlake; Robin Tadross	The Y's; Elizondo^{[a]}	4:36
12.	"Alive"	Danielle Brisebois; Lewis; Shanks	Shanks	3:30
13.	"Lost Then Found" (with OneRepublic)	Tedder; Jess Cates; Lewis; Lindy Robbins; Dan Muckala	Tedder; Brent Kutzle^{[a]}; Noel Zancanella^{[a]}; Muckala^{[a]}	4:05
14.	"Stone Hearts & Hand Grenades" (hidden track; begins after 3 minutes of silence)	Bunetta; Frampton; Bogart; Lewis	Bunetta; Frampton	4:04
Total length:				58:41

British iTunes Store pre-order and digital store edition bonus track
No.	Title	Writer(s)	Producer(s)	Length
14.	"Fly Here Now"	Jeff Bhasker; Lewis	Bhasker	3:40

British iTunes Store deluxe edition bonus tracks
No.	Title	Writer(s)	Length
14.	"Brave" (live at the Hackney Empire)	Bunetta; Frampton; Kotecha; Lewis	5:55
15.	"The First Time Ever I Saw Your Face" (live at the Hackney Empire)	Ewan MacColl	4:39
16.	"Echo – The Reflection of Sound" (video) (digital store exclusive)		13:23

British iTunes Store pre-order and digital store deluxe edition bonus track
No.	Title	Writer(s)	Producer(s)	Length
17.	"Fly Here Now"	Bhasker; Lewis	Bhasker	3:40

Japanese edition bonus tracks
No.	Title	Writer(s)	Producer(s)	Length
14.	"You Don't Care"	Lewis; Tedder	Tedder	4:03
15.	"Let It Rain"	Lewis; Shanks; Brisebois	Shanks	3:43
16.	"Fly Here Now"	Bhasker; Lewis	Bhasker	3:40
17.	"Happy" (Jason Nevins radio mix)	Lewis; Tedder; Bogart	Tedder; Jason Nevins^{[b]}	4:24^{[c]}

Hong Kong CD and 2025 LP edition bonus tracks
No.	Title	Length
18.	"Heartbeat"	3:51
19.	"I See You" (theme from Avatar)	4:20

North American standard edition
No.	Title	Writer(s)	Producer(s)	Length
1.	"Happy"	Lewis; Tedder; Bogart	Tedder	4:01
2.	"I Got You"	Martin; Birgisson; Kotecha	Birgisson	3:46
3.	"Love Letter"	Rudolf; Kasher	Rudolf	4:01
4.	"Can't Breathe"	Lewis; Kadouch; Aminov; Knighten; Lim; Ross; Malih	Kadouch; Vein; Mason, Jr.^{[a]}	4:15
5.	"You Don't Care"	Tedder; Lewis	Tedder	4:03
6.	"Outta My Head"	Martin; Schuster; Kotecha	Martin; Shellback	3:40
7.	"Brave"	Frampton; Bunetta; Kotecha; Lewis	Bunetta; Frampton	3:37
8.	"My Hands"	Wroldsen; Birgisson	Birgisson	4:14
9.	"Alive"	Lewis; Shanks; Brisebois	Shanks	3:30
10.	"Don't Let Me Down"	Lewis; Timberlake; Fauntleroy II; Elizondo; Tadross	The Y's; Elizondo^{[a]}	4:36
11.	"Fly Here Now"	Bhasker; Lewis	Bhasker	3:41
12.	"Broken"	Lewis; Stevenson; Shanks	Shanks	4:04
13.	"Lost Then Found" (with OneRepublic)	Lewis; Tedder; Muckala; Cates; Robbins	Tedder; Kutzle^{[a]}; Zancanella^{[a]}; Muckala^{[a]}	4:05
14.	"Stone Hearts & Hand Grenades" (hidden track; begins after 3 minutes of silence)			4:04

North American iTunes Store pre-order edition bonus track
No.	Title	Writer(s)	Producer(s)	Length
14.	"Naked"	Lewis; Kotecha; Lundin	Lundin; Shellback	3:49

North American iTunes Store deluxe edition bonus tracks
No.	Title	Writer(s)	Producer(s)	Length
14.	"Brave" (live at the Hackney Empire)	Bunetta; Frampton; Kotecha; Lewis		5:55
15.	"The First Time Ever I Saw Your Face" (live at the Hackney Empire)	MacColl		4:39
16.	"Echo – The Reflection of Sound" (video) (digital store exclusive)			13:23
17.	"Naked" (pre-order only)	Lewis; Kotecha; Lundin	Shellback; Lundin	3:49

Notes

- ^{^a} signifies co-producer
- ^{^b} signifies additional producer
- ^{^b} "Happy" (Jason Nevins radio remix) is not present on the 2025 vinyl pressings.

== Personnel ==
Credits taken from Echo's liner notes.

Managerial

- Executive producers – Simon Cowell, Clive Davis
- Production co-ordination – Angela N. Golightly

Performance

- Lead vocals – Leona Lewis
- Background vocals – Lewis, Ryan Tedder, Brent Kutzle, Justin Timberlake, Mandy Foster, Vicky Sandström, Cheryline "Che'Nelle" Lim, Stephen Simmonds, Sara-Jane Skeet, Beverly Skeet

Instruments

- Acoustic guitar – Tedder
- Bass guitar – Juliene Bunetta, John Shanks, Kutzle, John Garrison
- Cello – Kutzle
- Choir arrangement – Lawrence Johnson
- Drums – Tedder, Bunetta, Vinnie Colaiuta, Karl Brazil, Eddie Fisher
- Drum programming – Tedder, Zancanella
- Guitars – Andrew Frampton, Shanks, Esbjörn Öhrwall, Luke Potashnick
- Instruments on "Can't Breathe" – Uriel "Frenchie" Kadouch, "Vein"
- Instruments on "Love Letter" – Kevin Rudolf
- Instruments on "Naked" – Karl "Shellback" Schuster
- Other instrumentation on "Lost Then Found" – Tedder, Kutzle
- Keyboards – Frampton, Shanks, Charles Judge
- Piano – Tedder, Frampton, Kristian Lundin, Steve Robson, Dan Muckala
- Strings – Christine Wu, Urban Soul Orchestra, London Session Orchestra
- Strings arrangement – Stephen Hussey, Will Malone, Larry Gold
- Strings conductor – Hussey
- Synthesiser – Tedder, Kutzle

Technical

- Arrangement – Tedder, Muckala
- Co-production – Mike Elizondo, Mason, Kutzle, Noel Zancanella, Muckala
- Digital editing – Ron Taylor
- Engineering – Tedder, Bunetta, Zancanella, Craig Durrance, Joe Zook, Rich Cooper, Damian Lewis, Jeff Rothschild, Alex Gibson, Richard Flack
- Engineering assistants – Chris Kasych, Richard Woodcraft, Nicolas Esaig, Paul LaMalfa, Keith Armstrong, Nik Karpen
- Mastering – Vlado Meller
- Mixing – Phil Tan, Serban Ghenea, Manny Marroquin, Chris Lord-Alge, Jeremy Wheatley, Jean-Marie Horvat
- Mixing assistants – Tim Roberts, Christian Plata, Erik Madrid, Mimi Parker
- Mixing engineers – John Hanes, Brad Townsend, Andrew Schubert
- Production – Tedder, Arnthor Birgisson, Julian Bunetta, Kadouch, Frampton, Max Martin, Shellback, "Vein", Shanks, Lundin, Robson, The Y's
- Programming – Tedder, Rothschild, Dan Chase
- Pro-Tools editing – Lars Fox
- Recording – Birgisson, Shellback, Rich Cooper, Andrew Hey, Ann Minciel, Seth Waldmann, Neil Tucker, Joshua Berkman, Paul Foley
- Recording assistant – Christian Baker
- Vocal engineering – Seth Waldmann
- Vocal production – Lewis, Tedder, Birgisson, Bunetta, Frampton, Rudolf, Foster, Shanks, Lundin, Robson, Harvey Mason, Jr., Timberlake
- Vocal recording – Dabling Harward
- Vocal recording assistants – David Boyd, Michael Daley

== Recording locations ==
- Abbey Road Studios, London
- Chalice Recording Studios, Hollywood
- CMK Studios, Los Angeles
- Conway Studios, Los Angeles
- Dean Street Studios, London
- Germano Studios, New York City
- Henson Recording Studios, Hollywood
- Maratone Studios, Stockholm
- Mason Sound, North Hollywood
- Park Hill Studios, Denver
- The Rabbit Hole, Calabasas
- RAK Recording Studios, London
- Sphere Studios, London
- The Vault, Stockholm
- Westlake Studios, Los Angeles

== Charts ==
=== Weekly charts ===
Weekly chart performance for Echo
Chart (2009)	Peak position
Australian Albums (ARIA)	31
Austrian Albums (Ö3 Austria)	7
Belgian Albums (Ultratop Flanders)	52
Belgian Albums (Ultratop Wallonia)	41
Canadian Albums (Billboard)	16
Dutch Albums (Album Top 100)	36
French Albums (SNEP)	51
German Albums (Offizielle Top 100)	12
Greek Albums (IFPI)	49
Hungarian Albums (MAHASZ)	39
Irish Albums (IRMA)	2
Italian Albums (FIMI)	40
Japanese Albums (Oricon)	24
Mexican Albums (Top 100 Mexico)	98
New Zealand Albums (RMNZ)	26
Spanish Albums (Promusicae)	16
Swedish Albums (Sverigetopplistan)	19
Swiss Albums (Schweizer Hitparade)	3
UK Albums (Official Charts)	1
UK R&B Albums (Official Charts)	1
US Billboard 200	13

=== Year-end charts ===
2009 year-end chart performance for Echo
Chart (2009)	Position
Swiss Albums (Schweizer Hitparade)	79
UK Albums (OCC)	15

2010 year-end chart performance for Echo
Chart (2010)	Position
UK Albums (OCC)	140
US Billboard 200	196

== Certifications ==
Certifications for Echo
Region	Certification	Certified units/sales
Austria (IFPI Austria)	Gold	10,000^{*}
Canada (Music Canada)	Platinum	80,000^{^}
Germany (BVMI)	Gold	100,000^{‡}
Ireland (IRMA)	Platinum	15,000^{^}
Switzerland (IFPI Switzerland)	Gold	15,000^{^}
United Kingdom (BPI)	2× Platinum	600,000^{^}
^{*} Sales figures based on certification alone.^{^} Shipments figures based on certification alone.^{‡} Sales+streaming figures based on certification alone.

== Release history ==
Release dates and formats for Echo
Region	Date	Format(s)	Label	Catalogue	Ref.
Philippines	9 November 2009	CD	Sony Music Entertainment	88697570012	
Australia	13 November 2009	CD, digital download	Sony Music Entertainment	88697588222	
Germany	13 November 2009	CD, digital download	Sony Music Entertainment	88697588222	
Ireland	13 November 2009	CD, digital download	Sony Music Entertainment	88697570012	
Italy	13 November 2009	CD, digital download	Sony Music Entertainment	88697588222	
Netherlands	13 November 2009	CD	Sony Music Entertainment	0886975700127	
Switzerland	13 November 2009	Digital download, CD (standard & deluxe)	Sony Music Entertainment	88697588222	
Belgium	16 November 2009	Digital download, CD (standard & deluxe)	Sony Music Entertainment	88697588222	
Czech Republic	16 November 2009	Digital download, CD (standard & deluxe)	Sony Music Entertainment	88697588222	
France	16 November 2009	Digital download, CD (standard & deluxe)	Sony Music Entertainment	88697588222	
Greece	16 November 2009	Digital download, CD (standard & deluxe)	Sony Music Entertainment	88697588222	
Hong Kong	16 November 2009	CD	Sony Music Entertainment	88697570012	
Luxembourg	16 November 2009	Digital download, CD (standard & deluxe)	Sony Music Entertainment	88697588222	
New Zealand	16 November 2009	Digital download, CD (standard & deluxe)	Sony Music Entertainment	88697588222	
Norway	16 November 2009	Digital download, CD (standard & deluxe)	Sony Music Entertainment	88697570012	
Poland	16 November 2009	Digital download, CD (standard & deluxe)	Sony Music Entertainment	0886975882229	
Portugal	16 November 2009	Digital download, CD (standard & deluxe)	Sony Music Entertainment	88697588222	
Spain	16 November 2009	Digital download (standard & deluxe)	Sony Music Entertainment	88697588222	
United Kingdom	16 November 2009	CD, digital download	Syco Music	88697570012	
Brazil	16 November 2009	Digital download	Sony BMG	886975700127	
United States	17 November 2009	CD	J Records	886975966028	
Canada	17 November 2009	CD	Sony Music Entertainment	88697596602	
Denmark	18 November 2009	CD	Sony Music Entertainment	88697570012	
Finland	18 November 2009	CD	Sony Music Entertainment	88697570012	
Sweden	18 November 2009	CD	Sony Music Entertainment	88697570012	
Brazil	23 November 2009	CD	Sony Music Entertainment	886975700127	
Japan	25 November 2009	CD	Sony Music Japan	SICP2465	
Japan	25 November 2009	CD + DVD	Sony Music Japan	SICP2466	
