= Leona Lewis =

British singer (born 1985)

Leona Lewis OBE
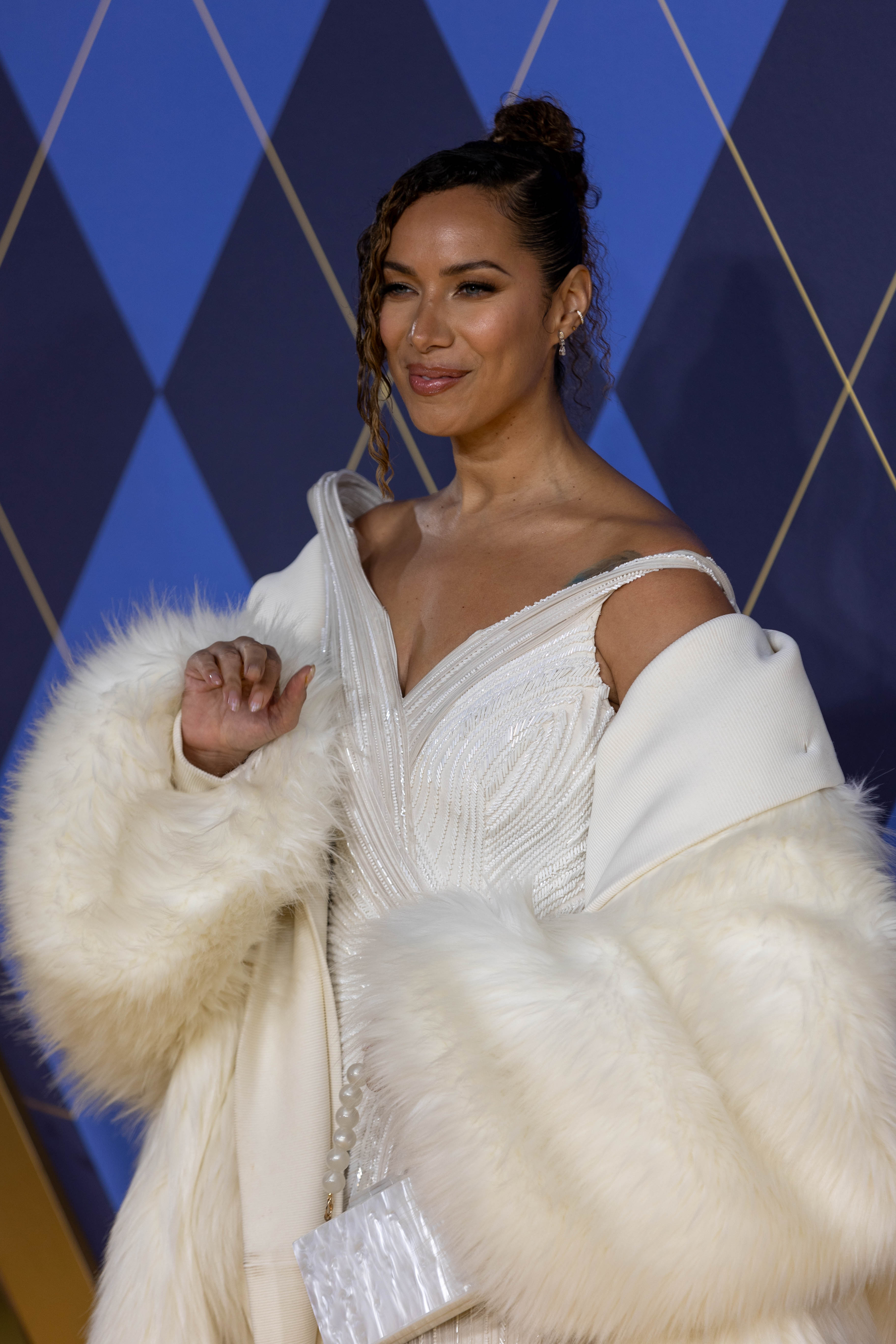
- Lewis in 2024
- Born: Leona Louise Lewis; 3 April 1985 (age 41); London, England
- Education: BRIT School
- Occupations: Singer; songwriter; actress; model; activist
- Years active: 2004–present
- Works: Discography
- Spouse: Dennis Jauch (m. 2019)
- Children: 1
- Awards: Full list
- Musical career
- Genres: R&B; pop; soul
- Instrument: Vocals
- Labels: Syco; J; RCA; Island; Def Jam; EmuBands
- Website: leonalewismusic.com

Signature
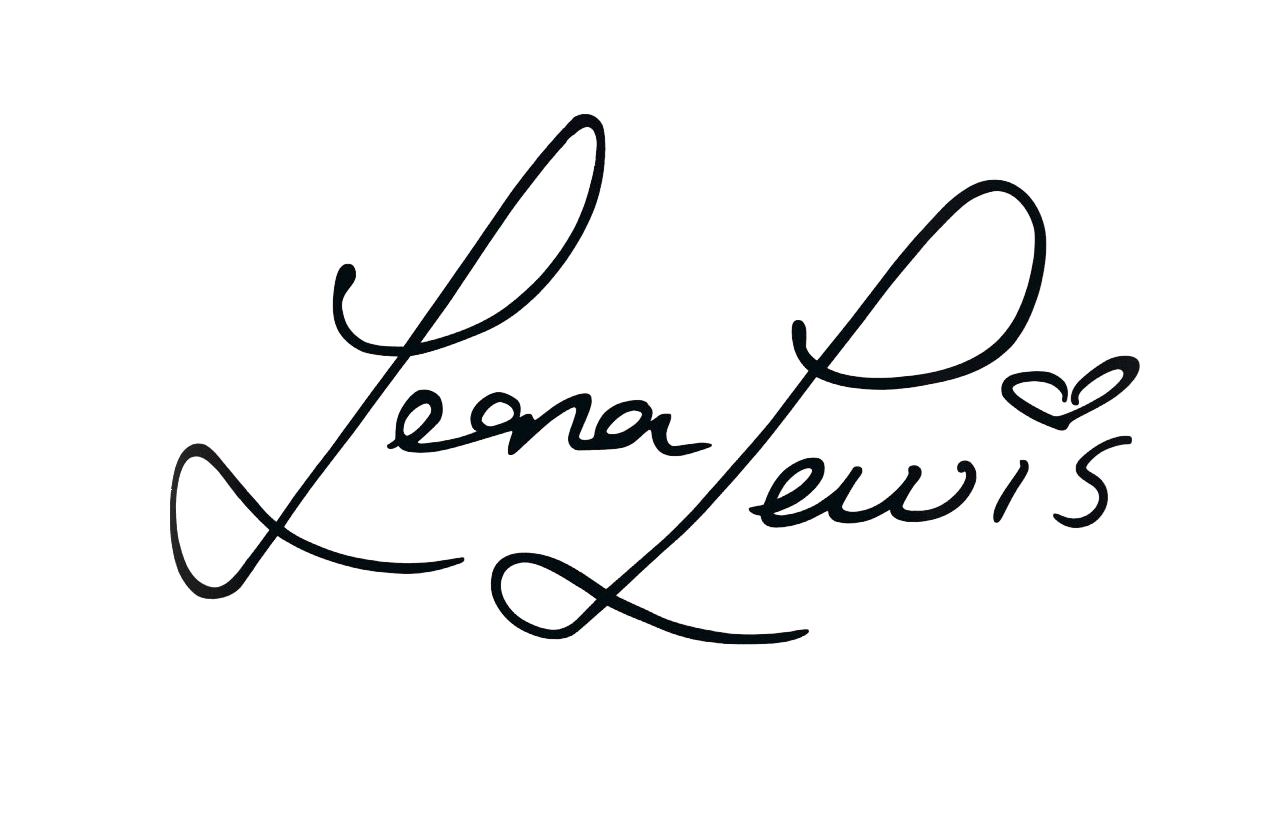

Leona Louise Lewis OBE (born 3 April 1985) is a British singer, songwriter, and actress. Born and raised in London, she later attended the BRIT School for Performing Arts and Technology in Croydon. Lewis achieved national recognition when she won the third series of the ITV talent competition The X Factor in 2006, winning a £1 million recording contract with Syco Music. Her winner's single, a cover of Kelly Clarkson's "A Moment Like This", peaked the UK Singles Chart for four weeks and broke a world record by reaching 50,000 digital downloads within 30 minutes. In February 2007, Lewis signed a five-album contract in the United States with Clive Davis's record label, J Records.

Lewis's success continued with the release of her debut studio album, Spirit (2007), which became the fourth best-selling album of the 2000s and one of the best-selling albums in UK chart history. The lead single, "Bleeding Love", spent seven weeks at the top of the UK Singles Chart and was Britain's best-selling single of 2007. Her second studio album, Echo (2009), entered at the top of the UK Albums Chart. In 2011, Lewis released the single "Collide", a collaboration with Swedish DJ Avicii, and her debut extended play, Hurt: The EP. Her third studio album, Glassheart (2012), marked a new creative direction for Lewis, drawing inspiration from dubstep and electronic music. She began to record material for her first Christmas album during her Glassheart Tour, which took place in mid 2013. Christmas, with Love was released later that year and its lead single, "One More Sleep", peaked at number three on the UK Singles Chart.

In 2014, Lewis made her film debut in Walking on Sunshine, and her fourth studio album, I Am, was released the following year. In 2016, she made her Broadway debut as Grizabella in the revival of Andrew Lloyd Webber's musical Cats, and the following year, she signed a modelling contract with Wilhelmina Models. She then collaborated with Calum Scott on the single "You Are the Reason" (2018), and had a recurring role on the American television series The Oath (2019). In 2021, Lewis joined the Paramount+ show Queen of the Universe as a judge. In 2025, Lewis embarked on her first concert residency, A Starry Night, in Las Vegas.

According to her record company, as of 2021, Lewis has sold over 35 million records worldwide. She is the first British female solo artist to reach the top five with eight singles, surpassing Olivia Newton-John's record of seven. Lewis has won two MOBO Awards, an MTV Europe Music Award, and two World Music Awards. She is also a six-time BRIT Award and three-time Grammy Award nominee. Aside from her music and acting career, Lewis has publicly supported various charitable causes, particularly animal rights; she is also vegan.

== Early life ==
Leona Louise Lewis was born on 3 April 1985 in London, to a father of Afro-Guyanese descent and a mother with Welsh, Irish and Italian ancestry. She has an older half-brother, Bradley, and a younger brother, Kyle. Noticing Lewis's passion for singing, her parents enrolled her at the Sylvia Young Theatre School and later at the Italia Conti Academy of Theatre Arts, the Ravenscourt Theatre School and the BRIT School for Performing Arts and Technology until they could no longer afford to do so, making cutbacks when necessary to help their daughter achieve her aspiration of being a singer.

== Career ==
=== 2001–2005: Struggles and setbacks ===
At the age of 17, Lewis decided to leave BRIT School to "get out there" and pursue a career in music. By then, she had already begun to write and record her own material, and she worked as a receptionist at a solicitor's office and as a Pizza Hut waitress in order to fund the studio sessions. At 18, Lewis secured a lead role in The Lion King theatre show in Paris; however, she withdrew after injuring her back while she was ice-skating.

Lewis recorded a demo album, called Twilight, in collaboration with Spiral Music, a production company based in Fulham, but it failed to secure her an album deal with any record companies. Although the album was never released commercially, Lewis performed a couple of the tracks live on BBC Radio 1 music station in 2004. Another demo album was recorded under license from UEG Entertainment, Best Kept Secret, which have reportedly claimed to have spent £70,000 trying to launch Lewis's career with no success. A track from the album, "Private Party", became a hit on the underground urban music scene in London in 2005. Speaking about her struggle to secure a record contract, Lewis said, "I tried to secure a record deal by doing things my own way. I worked very hard but I never managed to land a contract. That's why I decided to audition for The X Factor. It's programmes like these which provide the best place to showcase fresh new talent."

=== 2006: The X Factor and debut single ===
Simon Cowell (pictured) served as Lewis's mentor while on the third series of The X Factor

Lewis auditioned for the third series of The X Factor in 2006, singing "Over the Rainbow" for judges Simon Cowell, Louis Walsh, Sharon Osbourne and guest judge Paula Abdul. She was placed in the 16–24 category, with Cowell as her mentor. Throughout the course of the show, Lewis was compared with artists such as Mariah Carey, Whitney Houston and Celine Dion, performing songs by all three of them. Lewis defeated Ray Quinn to win the competition on 16 December 2006, receiving 60% of over eight million televotes cast in the final. As a prize for winning, Lewis signed a £1 million recording contract with Cowell's record label, Syco Music. Upon winning, Lewis said:

I'm just shocked. It's unbelievable. I feel like my dream has come true, the dream I've been dreaming since a little girl has come true. There were points I thought, "You know what, I don't know if this is going to happen". But with the help from my friends and my family, they all kept telling me to believe in myself and keep on doing it and I did and now I'm here and thank you so much to them.

Lewis's winner's single, a cover of Kelly Clarkson's song "A Moment Like This", was released on 17 December 2006. In the United Kingdom, it broke a world record after being digitally downloaded more than 50,000 times in less than 30 minutes. The song became the 2006 UK Christmas number-one single, selling 571,000 copies in its first week and selling more than the Top-40 combined. It spent four consecutive weeks atop the UK Singles Chart and was number one in Ireland for six weeks. Despite being released on 17 December, "A Moment Like This" became the second best selling single in the United Kingdom in 2006, and it has been certified platinum by the British Phonographic Industry (BPI), denoting shipments of over 600,000 copies. As of December 2014, Lewis's version has sold 900,000 copies in the United Kingdom.

=== 2007–2008: Spirit and international breakthrough ===
In February 2007, Lewis signed a £5 million (US$9.7 million) five-album contract in the United States with Clive Davis's record label, J Records, and showcased for several American music executives. A press release described how Cowell and Davis would work together in a "first-of-its-kind" partnership on both the song and producer selection for Lewis's debut album, Spirit. The songs were recorded in London, Miami, Los Angeles, New York City and Atlanta, while Lewis worked with several songwriters and record producers including Dallas Austin, Walter Afanasieff, Salaam Remi, Steve Mac, Stargate and Ne-Yo. It was released in November 2007 and entered both the Irish Albums Chart and the UK Albums Chart at number one, becoming the fastest-selling debut album in both countries, and the United Kingdom's fourth-fastest selling album of all time. Spirit is one of the biggest-selling albums of all time in the UK and is the best-selling debut album by a female artist in the 21st century.

It was released in several other nations in January 2008, and it went to number one in New Zealand, Australia, Austria, Germany, South Africa and Switzerland. Two more tracks were recorded in 2008 for the US release of the album: "Forgive Me", produced by Akon, and "Misses Glass", produced by Madd Scientist. It was released in the United States in April 2008 and entered the Billboard 200 at number one, making Lewis the first British artist to reach number one with a debut album. A special edition of Spirit was re-released in November 2008 in Europe, including the songs "Forgive Me", "Misses Glass" and a cover of the Snow Patrol song "Run". The album again went to number one in the UK Albums Chart. The album was certified 9× platinum in the UK where it is the fourth best-selling album of the 2000s decade.

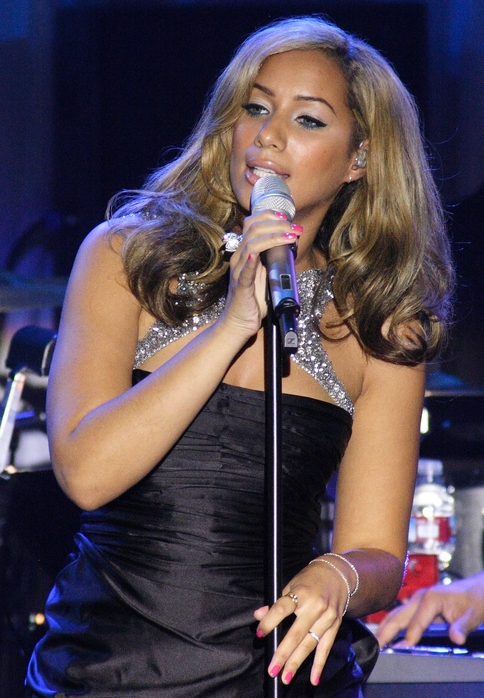
Lewis performing at the Clive Davis Pre Grammy Gala in 2009

Lewis's second single, "Bleeding Love", produced by Ryan Tedder and written by Tedder and Jesse McCartney, was released in October 2007 in the UK, where it sold 218,805 copies in its first week, giving it the biggest first-week sales of 2007 to date. It entered the UK Singles Chart at number one, where it stayed for seven weeks, and in the Irish Singles Chart, it remained at number one for eight weeks. It reached number one in the singles charts of New Zealand, Australia, France, Germany, Norway, Switzerland, Belgium, the Netherlands, Austria, Canada and the United States. "Bleeding Love" won The Record of the Year in December 2007. In February 2008, "Bleeding Love" entered the Billboard Hot 100 at number 85 and then went on to peak at number one for four non-consecutive weeks. The song became the first track by a UK female to reach number one since Kim Wilde's "You Keep Me Hangin' On" in 1987. Lewis's third single, a double A-side featuring "Better in Time" and "Footprints in the Sand", was released in the United Kingdom in March 2008, in aid of Sport Relief, and she visited South Africa for the charity. The single reached a peak of number two in the UK singles chart selling over 40,000 copies in its first week of physical release. "Better in Time" was released as Lewis's second single in the US, where it peaked at number 11 in the Billboard Hot 100. "Forgive Me" was released as Lewis's fifth single in November 2008; it reached number five in the UK. "Run" was released as a download-only single in the UK, reaching number one and becoming the UK's fastest-selling download-only single, with 69,244 copies sold in two days. Lewis's last single from Spirit, "I Will Be", was released in January 2009, only in North America.

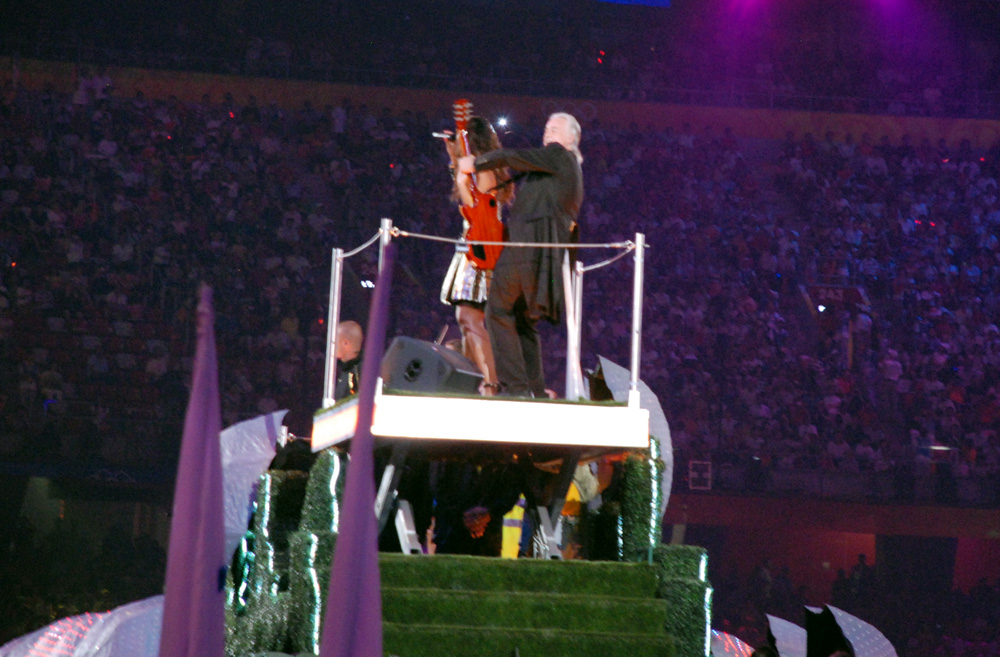
Lewis on stage with Jimmy Page at the closing ceremony of the 2008 Beijing Olympic Games. Lewis, Page and David Beckham represented Britain in the handing over segment for the 2012 Games to be held in London.

In August 2008, Lewis performed "Whole Lotta Love" with guitarist Jimmy Page of Led Zeppelin at the 2008 Summer Olympics closing ceremony in Beijing, representing the handover to London as the host of the 2012 Summer Olympics. In September 2008, she joined several female singers to perform a single for the anti-cancer campaign Stand Up to Cancer. The single,"Just Stand Up!", was performed live during the one-hour telethon that aired on all major US television networks. Lewis received three nominations for the 51st Grammy Awards in December 2008. "Bleeding Love" was nominated for Record of the Year and Best Female Pop Vocal Performance and Spirit was nominated for Best Pop Vocal Album. She was nominated for four BRIT Awards: or British Female Solo Artist, British Breakthrough Act, British Album for Spirit, and British Single for "Bleeding Love", but despite being the favourite to win the most awards, she received none. She won two awards at the 2008 MOBO Awards: Best Album for Spirit and Best Video for "Bleeding Love". In December 2008 Lewis was named 'Top New Artist' by Billboard magazine.

=== 2009–2010: Echo and The Labyrinth ===
Lewis's second album, Echo, was given a worldwide release in November 2009. Production took place throughout 2009, including work with Ryan Tedder, Justin Timberlake, Max Martin, Arnthor Birgisson, Kevin Rudolf, and John Shanks. It was recorded in Los Angeles and took nine months to produce. Lewis described the album as "more guitar-driven" compared to Spirit. Lewis performed her first full UK show at the Hackney Empire in London on 2 November 2009, performing songs from Spirit and Echo. Echo reached number one in the UK Albums Chart and the top ten of Austria, Ireland and Switzerland. Despite previous attempts from Lewis's lawyers to ban the release of Best Kept Secret by UEG Music, claiming that the singer had not given her consent, the album was released in January 2009, when the label insisted it owned the rights to the music and Lewis would receive a 50% share of the album's profits. However, a television advert for the album was banned by the Advertising Standards Authority, who said in a statement: "We considered that the claim 'Leona Lewis's new album' misleadingly implied it was the singer's latest recording rather than a new CD of tracks recorded some years ago." The album was released to iTunes in standard and deluxe editions, and two EPs, "Private Party" and "Dip Down"/"Joy", were released in September 2009.

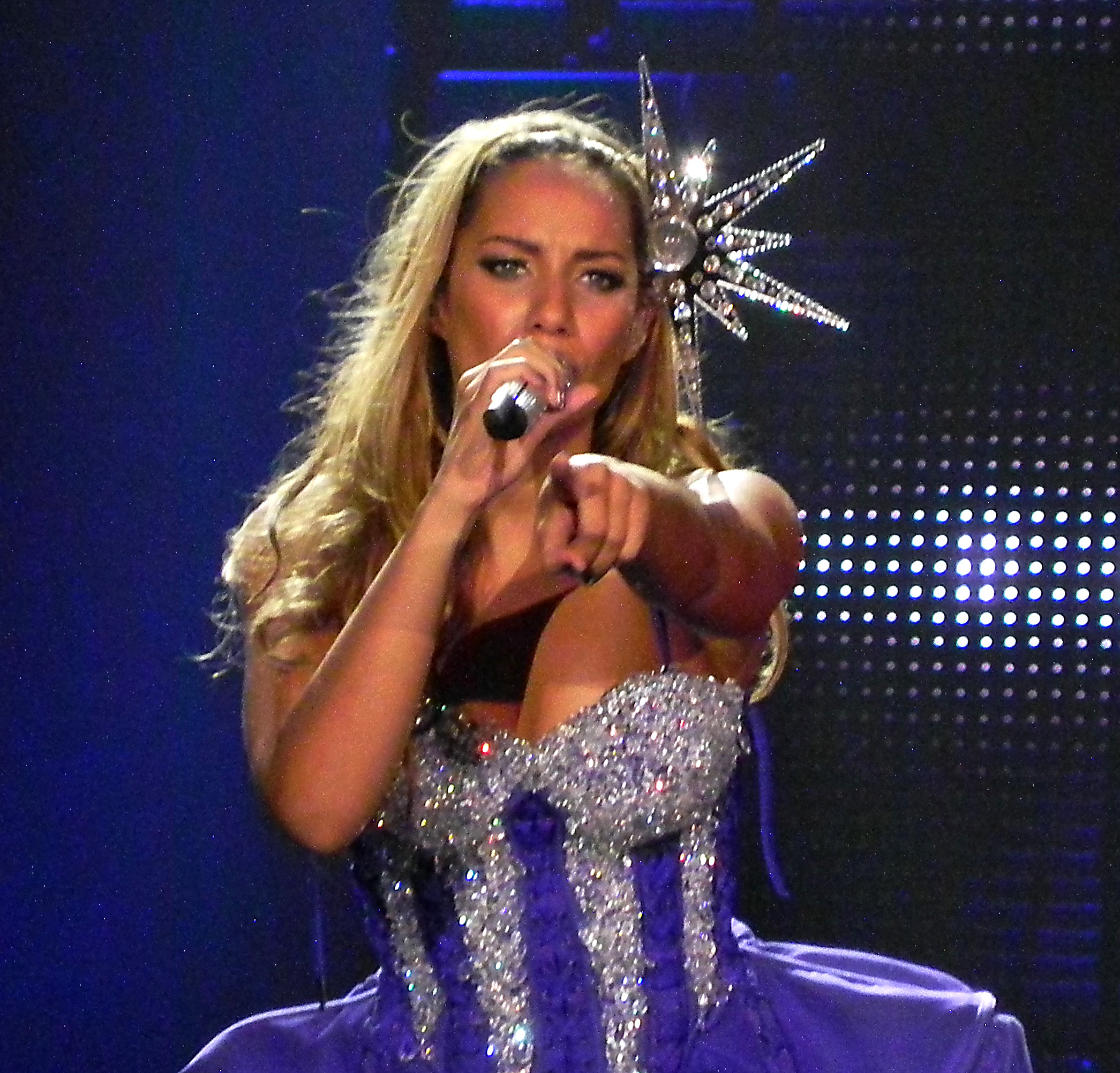
Lewis performing on The Labyrinth tour in 2010

The first single released from Echo was "Happy", which was written by Lewis, Tedder and Evan Bogart and produced by Tedder. The single was released on 15 September 2009, peaking at number two in the UK, and reaching the top ten in Austria, Belgium, Germany, Ireland, Japan and Switzerland. Lewis also recorded the theme song for the 2009 science fiction film Avatar, directed by James Cameron. The song, "I See You", was written by James Horner and Simon Franglen. It was nominated for Best Original Song at the 67th Golden Globe Awards. Another usage of Lewis's album can be found in "My Hands", which was used in the international release of the Square Enix video game Final Fantasy XIII. In January 2010, Lewis provided vocals on a cover of "Everybody Hurts", released to help raise money for victims of the 2010 Haiti earthquake. The second single from Echo, "I Got You", was released in February 2010. In April 2010, she featured on a duet with Italian singer Biagio Antonacci, called "Inaspettata (Unexpected)", from his album Inaspettata. They performed the song on the Italian TV show Io Canto on 22 October 2010. Lewis performed a 13-piece set list at the Rock in Rio festival in Lisbon, Portugal, on 22 May 2010, including songs from Spirit and Echo.

Lewis signed a book deal in January 2009 to release an illustrated autobiography in October 2009. The book, Dreams, contains mostly pictures taken by photographer Dean Freeman. At a book signing for Dreams on 14 October 2009, at the Piccadilly branch of Waterstone's book store in central London, Lewis was assaulted by a 29-year-old man from south London who began punching her in the head. He was arrested at the scene; the assailant was sectioned under the Mental Health Act 2007 and was charged with common assault. He admitted to the offence and was hospitalised for an indeterminate period.

Lewis's first tour, titled The Labyrinth supporting Spirit and Echo, started in May 2010. Lewis was scheduled to tour North America from July to August 2010 supporting Christina Aguilera's Bionic Tour, but Aguilera cancelled the tour, leaving Lewis's plans unknown. A DVD of the tour, along with a ten-track CD, was released with the title The Labyrinth Tour Live from The O2 on 29 November 2010.

=== 2011–2013: Hurt, Glassheart, and Christmas, with Love ===
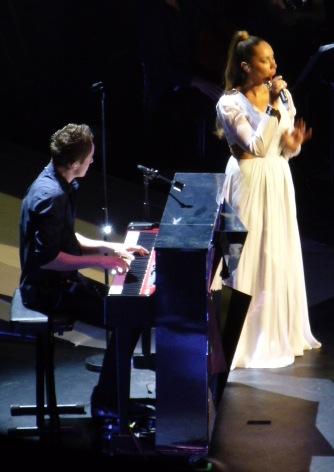
Lewis performing a cover of "Locked Out of Heaven" at the Royal Albert Hall, London on the Glassheart Tour, May 2013

Lewis began work on her third album, Glassheart, shortly after she had completed The Labyrinth tour. Though originally announced to be released on 28 November 2011 in the UK, it was eventually released in October 2012. The album was released on the RCA Records brand after RCA Music Group disbanded J Records along with Arista Records and Jive Records. Lewis described Glassheart as "energetic, deep, [and] unique" and said it would have a darker tone. She cited Tracy Chapman, Kate Bush and Tears for Fears as the album's primary influences. For the album, Lewis worked with numerous writers and producers including Ammo, Jonas Quant, Chuck Harmony, Claude Kelly, Ryan Tedder, Fraser T Smith, Al Shux, Steve Robson, Rico Love and Ne-Yo.

Lewis released a single, the dance-pop song "Collide", written by Autumn Rowe and produced by Sandy Vee, in the UK on 4 September 2011 and Germany on 9 September 2011. It debuted on the official UK top 40 singles chart at number 4. Furthermore, "Collide" charted at number one on the Dance Club Songs (Billboard) in the US, with the Afrojack remix nominated for Best Remixed Recording at the 2012 Grammy Awards. Lewis released an EP on 9 December 2011, Hurt: The EP, containing three covers. Lewis went on to perform on the American version of X Factor, and as the featured performer for the closing of the 2011 Doha Film Festival, where she sang ten songs, including several cover versions. In June 2012, she performed at BBC Radio 1's Hackney Weekend 2012 after being announced on 25 May 2011 as an ambassador for the event. It was the BBC's biggest ever free-ticketed live music event. Following the announcement that Lewis would be an ambassador, she performed a special Live Lounge at the Hackney Empire, with a reggae version of "Better in Time", which incorporated Rihanna's "Man Down", and a cover of Labrinth's "Let the Sun Shine". At the Hackney Weekend, Lewis performed further cover versions and debuted the song "Come Alive" from Glassheart.

In August 2012, Lewis announced that the lead single from Glassheart would be "Trouble", released on 7 October 2012. It entered the UK Singles Chart at number seven. The album debuted at number three in the UK and at number four in Ireland, respectively. Lewis embarked on a 16-date tour in the UK beginning in April 2013.

In February 2013, Lewis left her management, Modest! Management. In July 2013, Lewis revealed that her new studio album would be a "Motown-influenced" Christmas collection, with both classic covers and original material. The album, Christmas, with Love, was released on 2 December 2013 and the lead single, "One More Sleep", was released on 5 November 2013. Lewis performed the song on the semi-final of the tenth series of The X Factor on 8 December 2013. The same day, "One More Sleep" debuted at number 34 on the UK Singles Chart with Christmas, with Love debuting at number 25 on the UK Albums Chart. A week later, Christmas, with Love advanced to number 13 and "One More Sleep" climbed 31 places to number 3, making it Lewis's highest-charting single since 2009's "Happy". With "One More Sleep" peaking inside the top five on the UK Singles Chart, Lewis set a new record for British female solo artist with the most top five singles in the history of the chart, bringing her total to eight. She has overtaken Olivia Newton-John's tally of seven top five singles.

=== 2014–present: I Am, collaborations, and acting ===
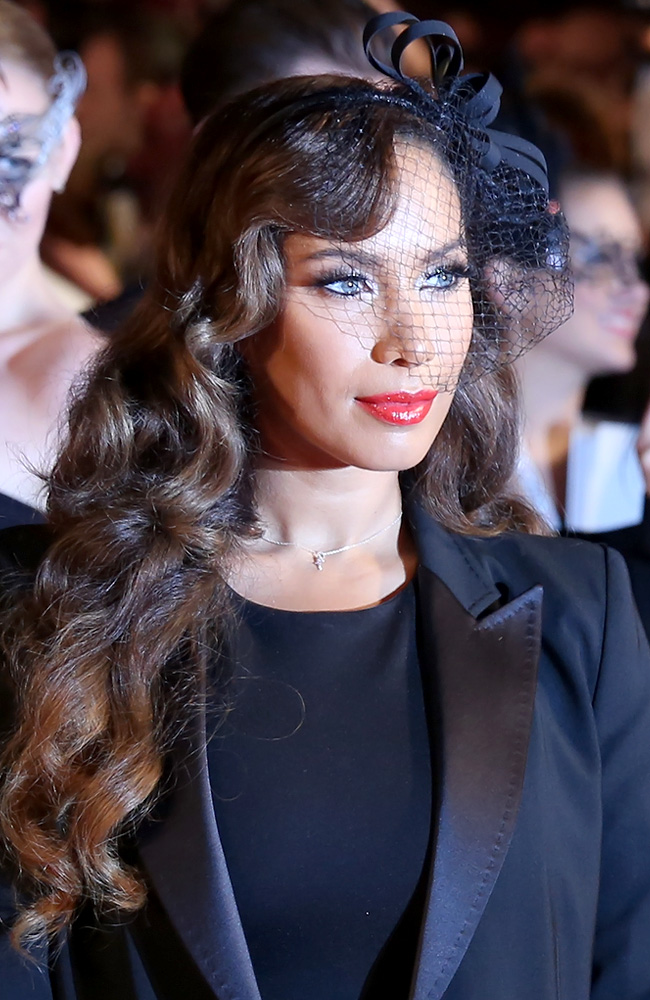
Lewis at the 2014 Life Ball in Vienna

Lewis featured on Michael Bolton's cover of "Ain't No Mountain High Enough" for his album of the same name, which was released in May 2014. The same month, she performed the traditional pre-match anthem "Abide with Me", and the national anthem "God Save the Queen", at the FA Cup Final, and the song "La La La" with Naughty Boy at the 2014 World Music Awards.

In June 2014, Lewis had parted ways with Syco Music, and signed a new record deal with Universal Music's Island Records UK. Lewis later revealed that her departure from Syco had come after "several years" of consideration. She also stated that when she expressed her desire to part with the label, she was threatened with the public being told that she had been dropped instead of parting amicably. However, further creative differences in relation to her fifth studio album finally caused Lewis to leave the label. Of her departure, she stated, "I was asked to make a record that would not have been true to myself. By all means as an artist in this climate, I was thankful to even get the chance to make another record. But I cannot make music that does not speak to my soul, and as scary as it seemed, I could no longer compromise myself, and so I decided to leave".

In April 2015, during an intimate showcase in London, Lewis revealed "Fire Under My Feet" to be the lead single from her fifth studio album. The song premiered on BBC Radio 2 on 11 May 2015. In July, "I Am" and "Thunder", were released as the album's second and third singles, respectively; "Thunder" served as the album's lead single in the US. The album I Am was released on 11 September 2015, in the UK. That day, Lewis announced her third headlining concert tour, titled the I Am Tour, which ran from February to March 2016. On 13 September 2015, she performed songs from I Am during her set on the main stage at Radio 2 Live in Hyde Park. On 26 September 2015, Lewis appeared as a special guest at the Nashville concert on Taylor Swift's The 1989 World Tour, where the pair performed "Bleeding Love" as a duet. After the show, Swift took to Twitter, stating, "Oh my God @leonalewis sang 'Bleeding Love' tonight in Nashville and I may never recover". In December 2015, Lewis performed a cover of "Girl Crush" with Adam Lambert at the CMT Artists of the Year event. The performance earned the pair a CMT Music Award nomination in 2016.

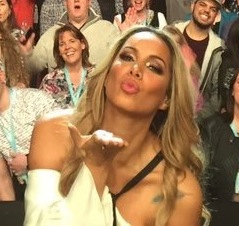
Lewis in 2016

Lewis split from Island Records in June 2016 because of "something that didn't click". In December, she reimagined Hans Zimmer's "Now We Are Free" on the album Hans Zimmer: The Classics. The following December, she paid tribute to Lionel Richie with a performance at the 40th Annual Kennedy Center Honors. In 2018, Lewis collaborated with Calum Scott on a new version of his song "You Are the Reason" recorded as a duet, with Pitbull on "Amore", the lead single for the 2018 film Gotti, and with Hellberg on the song "Headlights". "You Are the Reason" peaked at number 43 in the UK and charted across the world, and was later certified gold by the BPI and platinum by the RIAA. In 2018, Lewis performed at the National Memorial Day Concert in Washington, D.C., and at the 92nd Annual Macy's Thanksgiving Day Parade in New York. She appeared as a musical guest in an episode of NBC's 2019 television show Songland, searching for upcoming songwriters. Lewis recorded the winning song, "Solo Quiero (Somebody to Love)", which was written during the show. In November 2019, she performed at the Royal British Legion Festival of Remembrance, at Royal Albert Hall, London, honouring servicemen and veterans.

During this period, Lewis turned to acting. She appeared in a supporting role of Elena in the 1980s-inspired 2014 musical film Walking on Sunshine. She also made her Broadway debut, as Grizabella, in the July 2016 revival of Andrew Lloyd Webber's musical Cats. She left the role, after three months of playing the character, on 9 October 2016. In 2018, she was cast in the recurring role of Amber Hall in the Sony Crackle's TV series The Oath, which premiered in February 2019. Lewis also appeared as a judge on the UK TV series The X Factor: The Band.

In December 2020, Lewis sang alongside Smokey Robinson, Tori Kelly and Sam Fischer on a cover of "What The World Needs Now", with all proceeds going to the American Red Cross. Lewis announced she would tour with Gary Barlow on his All the Hits Live 2021 tour, in November and December 2021 in arenas across the UK and Ireland. It was her first time touring since the 2016 I Am Tour.

In August 2021, Lewis featured alongside singer James Morrison on the debut album of songwriter Diane Warren, on a song titled "Grow Old with Me". On 28 October 2021, Lewis announced she would be a judge on the Paramount+ series Queen of the Universe, which premiered in December. In November 2021, Lewis released the song "Kiss Me It's Christmas", featuring Ne-Yo. The song features on the re-issue of the 2013 album Christmas, with Love, titled Christmas, with Love Always, released on 19 November 2021. In December 2021, Lewis was named Spotify Equal UK and Ireland Artist of the Month. In the same month, Lewis was a special guest on BBC One's I Can See Your Voice Christmas special. Lewis also performed at the Royal Carols: Together at Christmas carol concert at Westminster Abbey. The concert, hosted by Catherine, Duchess of Cambridge, celebrated the heroes and volunteers of the COVID-19 pandemic.

In March 2022, Lewis received a nomination at the 2022 Music Week Awards, for her Christmas, with Love Always marketing campaign in 2021. In October 2023, Lewis voiced the character of "London Lilly" in Snoop Dogg's children's series Doggyland. In November 2023, Lewis starred in the animated Christmas film Glisten and the Merry Mission, voicing the character "Glisten".

In November and December 2023, Lewis played various arenas and theatres across the UK on the Christmas with Love Tour. In 2024, the UK Official Charts named Lewis' 2013 Christmas single "One More Sleep" the most-played modern Christmas song in the UK. In March 2025, Billboard named Lewis one of the "Top 100 Women Artists of the 21st Century" in the US.

On 28 July 2025, Lewis announced her upcoming Las Vegas residency at the Venetian Resort, called A Starry Night, running from October 2025 to January 2026.

== Artistry ==
'Bleeding Love'
The song features a church organ and synthesised strings prominently, and intermittently integrates wood block percussion throughout the track. A heavy, distorted marching band-like drum loop backs the song.

"Homeless"
Lewis was praised for her vocals on "Homeless".

Lewis has a coloratura soprano vocal range, which spans four octaves, and has had classical training. She has stated that she practices operatic scales every week. Music critic Neil McCormick, of The Daily Telegraph, has praised Lewis's technical skills: "Her mezzo-soprano range allows her to take melodies from luxurious low notes to high-flying falsetto, gliding with elegant power and impressive control through all kinds of fluctuations and modulations". Stephen Thomas Erlewine of AllMusic added, "Lewis can hit [high belted] notes but make it seem easy, never straining her voice and building nicely to the climax.... Unlike most divas, there is a human quality to her voice, as she's singing to the song, not singing to her voice". In the same vein, Slant described Lewis's vocals as "technically unimpeachable" in a review of her album Echo, but criticised them for "lacking any warmth or emotional expression".

Lewis commented on the musical style of her debut album describing the album as "classic songs with a contemporary edge", with R&B and "fresh pop" styles, ballads and "soulful up-tempo numbers". It has an American style, with some electronic 1980s sounds. However, the songs are not beat-driven or following the latest trends but can be performed acoustically. Lewis's second album, Echo, mixed pop and R&B; during an interview with Variety magazine, she said on the album's sound that she "wanted the album to have a little bit more of a live feel to it, with a little more live instrumentation." In February 2011, talking about her third studio album Glassheart, Lewis said that the album would be more experimental than Spirit and Echo by embodying a "different" yet "classic" sound. She added, "I'm really, really excited about it. I'm working with some new producers, some up and coming people and it's going to be kind of a different sound – but still classic". Lewis described it as "energetic, deep, [and] unique". She also commented that it would have a darker tone and that she would be putting her "heart into [her] lyrics".

Lewis credits Whitney Houston and Mariah Carey among her major influences: "when I was growing up I used to listen to Whitney Houston, Mariah Carey, those kind[s] of big powerful kind of singers so that influences a lot of my music and a lot of the songs I like to sing". She also credits Sia, Celine Dion, Taylor Swift, Tegan and Sara and Brittany Howard as some of her female inspirations, as well as Beyoncé.

== Activism and charity work ==
In October 2008, The Times reported that Lewis had turned down a seven-figure sum from Mohamed Al Fayed to open a Harrods sale. Lewis commented that she turned down the deal on the grounds that Harrods is the only UK department store that continues to stock clothing made from animal fur: "It wasn't a million pounds that I was offered, as the papers reported, but even if it had been, I still would have turned it down". "I got a lot of flak for that. There were people who said I should have done it and given the money to charity, but that would have been such a contradiction." She announced in October 2008 that she was in the "bargaining period" of launching her own ethical line of accessories through Topshop and that she was in the late stages of releasing her own perfume in Europe. Her perfume, Leona Lewis, was launched by LR in July 2009. In 2010, she set up a fashion company with her then-boyfriend, Lou Al-Chamaa, called LOA Clothing Ltd, which was dissolved in 2012. In 2010, Lewis featured in Modern Dog magazine, where she stated her love of dogs and horses, and her admiration for the McCartney family's stance against animal cruelty.

In 2011, Lewis was a guest judge on Platinum Hit, and in May 2012, she returned to The X Factor as a guest judge during auditions in London for the ninth series for Kelly Rowland. In March 2013, Lewis was announced as the new brand activist for The Body Shop and released a cruelty-free makeup range. She has also shown support for Little Kids Rock, a non-profit organization that works to restore and revitalize music education in disadvantaged US public schools, by donating items for auction to raise money for the organization. In February 2016, she became a brand ambassador for Kiss Products. Lewis headlined Cirque du Soleil's One Night for One Drop performance in Las Vegas in March 2016, to help to raise funds and awareness for critical water issues worldwide. In June 2016, she released a charity single "(We All Are) Looking for Home", created in collaboration with Diane Warren for the Vanderpump Dog Foundation's public service announcement, in opposition to the Yulin Dog Meat Festival.

Lewis signed a modelling contract with Wilhelmina Models in 2017. That year, she became ambassador of MTV Staying Alive to "empower and educate the new generation" in the fight against HIV/AIDS. Lewis and MTV Staying Alive partnered with Kiehl's to create a Creamy Eye Treatment, with £10 from every product sold going towards educating young people in preventing HIV/AIDS. In 2018, she designed Christmas-themed jumpers with Hopefield Animal Sanctuary, with all net profits going towards the charity. Moreover, she supports (RED)'s Global Fund to end AIDS, and in association with the app Calm contributed narration of a sleep story, thus providing 100,000 people with life-saving HIV medication. Lewis, initially contracted to serve as a guest judge, became a permanent judge on The X Factor: The Band in December 2019, joining during the Audience auditions. That same month, Lewis opened a vegan cafe in Pasadena called Coffee and Plants, which is plant-based with everything recyclable and a tree planted after 100 cups sold. The cafe works in partnership with Hopefield Animal Sanctuary, with proceeds of select items donated to the charity.

In March 2020, Lewis hosted and performed at the youth empowerment event WE Day, at Wembley. The event celebrates students, recognising their impacts on local and global issues. Lewis performed her duet You Are The Reason with singer Calum Scott. Whilst introducing the show and herself, Lewis stated "I'm someone who knows how far a voice can take you. I won a little show called X Factor 14 years ago. And that never would have happened if I had not learnt to use my voice." In May 2020, during the COVID-19 pandemic, Lewis joined several performers during the One Humanity Live broadcast on social media, helping to raise funds for COVID-19 initiatives, performing a cover of "True Colors". Lewis continued her charitable work throughout 2020, releasing a cover of Robbie Williams's "Angels" in honour of the NHS. In December 2020, Lewis headlined the NSPCC's virtual Christmas concert raising money for Childline and backed Save The Children's campaign to prevent child hunger at Christmas. Furthermore, Lewis sang alongside Smokey Robinson, Tori Kelly and Sam Fischer on a cover of "What The World Needs Now", with all proceeds going to the American Red Cross. Lewis also continued to raise money, via Cameo, for Hopefield Animal Sanctuary and RED on World Aids Day, with 100% of the proceeds going to charity.

In June 2021, Lewis was made the official patron of the Hackney Empire, as part of its 120-year anniversary celebrations. Lewis will continue to mentor students and host workshops to champion the arts of the students at the historic venue.

In April 2023, Lewis released the theme song "One Step Closer" to the new Apple TV+ series Jane. The series is inspired by Dr. Jane Goodall and highlights animal activism and conservation, with its lead character Jane, a young girl, saving the planet and its animals. The song's writer, Diane Warren, donated some of the proceeds from the song to the Jane Goodall Institute. Lewis narrated It's up to Us: A Children’s Terra Carta for Nature, People and Planet, in collaboration with King Charles III and The Prince's Trust, via Ecoflix, encouraging children to save the planet. Furthermore, Lewis won the Sustainable Style Award at the Maison de Mode’s 2023 Sustainable Style Awards, recognising her support for sustainable initiatives and animal welfare.

In October 2023, in collaboration with Snoop Dogg, the pair released a song on World Mental Health Day entitled "It's Okay" to help raise awareness for children’s mental health and wellness.

Lewis was appointed Officer of the Order of the British Empire (OBE) in the 2024 New Year Honours for services to music and charity.

== Personal life ==
In 2010, Lewis began dating Dennis Jauch, a professional dancer and choreographer. They married in July 2019 at Sting's estate in Tuscany, Italy. Their daughter was born in July 2022.

Lewis has been vegetarian since the age of 12 and vegan since September 2012. She won PETA's Sexiest Vegetarian, along with Red Hot Chili Peppers frontman Anthony Kiedis, in 2008 and Europe's Sexiest Vegetarian in 2009, along with actor Scott Maslen. She also was named PETA's Person of the Year for 2008. Lewis is a supporter of World Animal Protection and is a patron of the Hopefield Animal Sanctuary in Brentwood, Essex.

In September 2014, in an open letter to fans, Lewis revealed that she felt extremely depressed around the time of her departure from Syco. She later emphasised that it was not clinical depression from which she had been suffering. She credited her professional separation from Simon Cowell and her practice of meditation with helping her "still the madness". In 2017, Lewis revealed she has Hashimoto's disease, detailing the pain and fatigue experienced because of the condition.

In November 2019, Lewis sold her $2.25 million Californian ranch, in Glendale, upscaling to a $3.7 million property in the guard-gated Hidden Hills, Los Angeles. She sold the property to Simon Cowell in 2020 for $3.9 million. She purchased her Studio City home for $2.6 million in March 2021.

== Filmography ==
=== Film ===
Year	Title	Role	Notes
2014	Walking on Sunshine	Elena	Supporting role
2023	Glisten and the Merry Mission	Glisten	Animation voice role

=== Television ===
Year	Title	Role	Notes
2006, 2012, 2018	The X Factor	Herself	2006: Contestant; winner (Series 3); 2012: Guest judge (Series 9); 2018: Guest judge at judges' houses (Series 15)
2007	This Is Your Life	Herself	Featured performer
2007	Saturday Night Divas	Herself	Featured performer
2008	Divas II	Herself	Featured performer
2010	So You Think You Can Dance	Herself	Featured performer
2010	The Labyrinth Tour: Live from the O2	Herself	
2011	Platinum Hit	Herself	Special guest judge
2011	Majors & Minors	Herself	Mentor
2012	Project Hackney	Herself	Ridiculousness Season 8 episode 5 July 21, 2016 Special guest as herself
2018	The Voice UK	Herself	Advisor (Series 7)
2018	The 92nd Annual Macy's Thanksgiving Day Parade	Herself	Featured performer
2019	The Oath	Amber Hall	Recurring role (6 episodes)
2019	Songland	Herself	Musical guest
2019	Queen of Drags	Herself	Guest judge (Series 1, episode 3: "Fairytale")
2019	The X Factor: The Band	Herself	Judge
2021	Queen of the Universe	Herself	Judge
2021	I Can See Your Voice	Herself	Special guest (Christmas Special)
2023	Doggyland	London Lilly	
2023	The Masked Singer	Herself	Guest judge (Christmas Special)
2024	Kindergarten: The Musical	Hedgehog Holmes	Voice role; Episode: "All or Muffin/Bring in 'da Cake, Bring in 'da Fun"

== Theatre credits ==
Year(s)	Production	Role	Location	Category
2016	Cats	Grizabella	Neil Simon Theatre	Broadway

== Discography ==
- Spirit (2007)
- Echo (2009)
- Glassheart (2012)
- Christmas, with Love (2013)
- I Am (2015)

== Tours ==
Headlining

- The Labyrinth (2010)
- Glassheart Tour (2013)
- I Am Tour (2016)
- Christmas with Love Tour (2023)

Co-headlining

- The X Factor Live Tour (2007)

Residency

- A Starry Night: The Las Vegas Christmas Residency (2025–2026)

Opening act

- All the Hits Live (Very special guest of Gary Barlow) (2021)

== Written works ==
- Dreams. Hodder & Stoughton. 15 October 2009. ISBN 0340918993.

== See also ==
- List of artists who reached number one in the United States
- List of artists who reached number one on the U.S. Dance Club Songs chart
- List of artists who reached number one on the UK Singles Chart
- List of artists who reached number one on the UK Singles Downloads Chart
- List of awards and nominations received by Leona Lewis

Preceded by Shayne Ward	Winner of The X Factor; 2006	Succeeded by Leon Jackson
