= Collide (Leona Lewis and Avicii song) =

Single by Leona Lewis and Avicii
- Released: 22 August 2011
- Studio: Henson Recording Studios (Los Angeles)
- Genre: Dance-pop; house
- Length: 3:59
- Label: J; Syco
- Songwriters: Tim Bergling; Simon Jeffes; Arash Pournouri; Autumn Rowe; Sandy Wilhelm
- Producers: Sandy Vee; Youngboyz

Leona Lewis singles chronology
"I Got You" (2009)	"Collide" (2011)	"Hurt: The EP" (2011)

Avicii singles chronology
"Fade into Darkness" (2011)	"Collide" (2011)	"Levels" (2011)

Music video
- "Collide" on YouTube

"Collide" is a song performed by British recording artist Leona Lewis and Swedish DJ and record producer Avicii. It was written by Tim Bergling, Simon Jeffes, Arash Pournouri, Autumn Rowe, Sandy Wilhelm, with production helmed by Wilhelm under his production name Sandy Vee and Youngboyz. "Collide" is a dance-pop and house song with instrumentation consisting of piano riffs and a guitar. The song was recorded for Lewis' third studio album Glassheart, but was not included on the album's final track listing.

Upon the release of the single, Avicii claimed that Lewis and her record label, Syco, had sampled his song "Penguin" without his authorisation, and accused them of plagiarism. Before the lawsuit filed by Avicii and his record label reached the high court, Syco announced that the song would be a joint release between Lewis and Avicii. The song premiered in the United Kingdom on 15 July 2011 and was sent to Australian radio on 22 August 2011. "Collide" was released digitally via the iTunes Store on 2 September, as part of a collection of the original song, as well as remixes by Afrojack, Cahill, Alex Gaudino and Jason Rooney. The Afrojack remix is included as a bonus track on the deluxe edition of Glassheart.

"Collide" received a mixed reaction from music critics. Some were complimentary of Lewis's vocal performance and compared it to Katy Perry's song "Firework", whilst others were critical of its musical structure. The song achieved commercial success, and peaked inside the top five of the singles charts in Ireland, Scotland and the United Kingdom. It also peaked at number one on the US Dance Club Songs chart. As part of promotion for the song, an accompanying music video was shot on a beach in Malibu, California and directed by Ethan Ladder. Lewis also performed the song on the game show Red or Black? and at London nightclub G-A-Y, along with other songs. At the 2012 Grammy Awards, the Afrojack remix was nominated for Best Remixed Recording.

== Background and release ==
Lewis began planning her third studio album Glassheart in June 2010, shortly after completing her first headline tour: The Labyrinth. "Collide" was written by Arash Pournouri, Autumn Rowe, Sandy Wilhelm, Simon Jeffes and Tim Berg, with production of the song helmed by Wilhelm (under his production name Sandy Vee) and Youngboyz. On 14 July 2011, Lewis announced via her official Twitter account that the song would premiere in the United Kingdom on The Scott Mills Show radio talk show the following day on 15 July, saying "So excited to let u know to tune into Scott Mills show on Radio One tomorrow for the worldwide exclusive play of my summer single 'Collide' (sic)." With regard to the song, Lewis spoke about "Collide" and why she chose to release it as the lead single, saying

I'm excited for people to see a different side to my music. I'm a fan of so many different genres and styles. For me this song has all the great ingredients of a summer anthem. I can't wait for my fans to hear it and to share the rest of the album.

"Collide" was released to Australian mainstream radio on 22 August 2011. On 2 September 2011, "Collide" was released to download digitally via iTunes as part of a collection of the original song as well as remixes by Afrojack, Cahill, Alex Gaudino and Jason Rooney, in Austria, Ireland, Italy, Sweden, Switzerland, United Kingdom and the United States. In Germany, the song was released as a CD single on 16 September 2011. Glassheart was originally set to be released in November 2011 following "Collide", however the album was subsequently pushed back several times into early 2012, then Summer 2012, before settling in October 2012.

== Sampling controversy ==
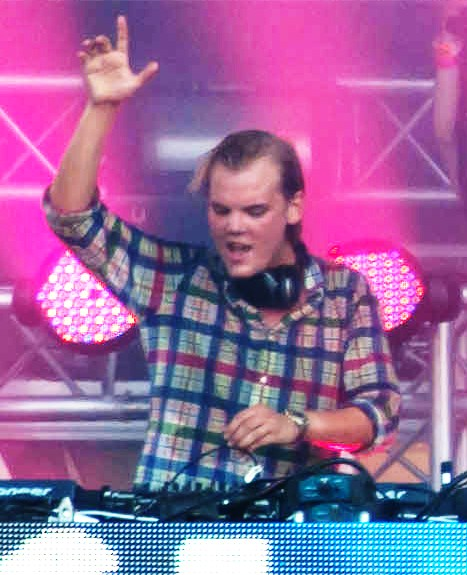
"Collide" contains a sample of Avicii's song "Fade into darkness".

Soon after "Collide" premiered, the song received comparisons to an instrumental dance track called "Penguin" by Swedish DJ and recorded producer Avicii. Avicii's "Penguin" samples the instrumental of "Perpetuum Mobile" by Penguin Cafe Orchestra. The song originally credited Lewis as the only artist on the track, which prompted a lawsuit against Lewis, and her record label Syco, as Avicii claimed that they had sampled his version of the song without his permission. According to Avicii's manager Ash Pournouri, he thought that Lewis was going to only sample the original version by Penguin Cafe Orchestra. In a statement, Pournouri said "We were under the impression that they were going to sample the original. They ended up copying our version. We never allowed Syco to replay our version of the track. The original sample rights belong to Simon Jeffes (Penguin Cafe Orchestra) and approval for using that composition is not in our control." As part of the lawsuit for not receiving credit on "Collide", Avicii attempted to have the release of the song suspended until an agreement was reached.

Prior to the case reaching the high court, Lewis tweeted that Avicii was fully aware of his song being sampled on "Collide", "With regards to my song, Avicii was aware & agreeing publishing splits for himself and his manager. When Avicii sent his track out to have a song written over it I totally fell in love with this version and I think he's super talented." Syco also responded to the claim, stating that Avicii was always going to work with Lewis, and that he would be credited on the song. In response, Avicii accused Lewis and her label of lying about working together, and tweeted "Thanks for accusing me of lying and speaking on my behalf. Since we never met or even spoke, please let me and my manager know who told you that and what confirmation they gave you." Hours before both Lewis's and Avicii's record labels were supposed to appear in the high court, Syco released a statement that both record labels had reached an agreement and that Avicii would appear as a featured artist on "Collide", whilst Lewis would appear as the lead artist. Avicii and his record label were pleased with the result, with the former saying "Glad to FINALLY have resolved situation with Leona. Music is the answer ... We've finally come to an agreement with Leona on all the issues ... So happy to move on and focus on hit making ... So happy to move on with Leona and focus on having a hit together." The latter stated "Avicii is an up-and-coming talent; we think he should be given a fair crack at making this record the hit it deserves to be."

== Composition and lyrics ==
"Collide"
A 24-second sample of "Collide" containing a part of the chorus from the song.

The song was composed in the key of F# major using common time and a groove of 125 beats per minute. According to Michael Cragg for The Guardian, the song is built upon a "pounding beat" which incorporates elements of house. Instrumentation is provided by a piano riffs and a guitar. Lewis's vocal range in the song spans nearly an octave, from the low note of G♯_{3} to the high note of E♭_{5}. Lewis makes use of harmonies throughout the duration of the song.

Amy Sciarretto for Popcrush noted that Lewis appeared to be restraining her vocals on the song, writing "Lewis exercising incredible restraint, as she doesn’t let her remarkable, room-filling, enviable voice soar like we are used to." Sciarretto continued to note that towards the end of the song, the singer does not show any restraint, and that it is a common device used in song production as it allows the singer to build tension. Lyrically, "Collide" is a love song, in which Lewis sings "I'll pick you up when you're down / Be there when no one's around / I'm in tune with how you feel / Everything 'bout this is real / When you're in unfamiliar places / Count on me through life's changes." Sciarretto also noted that it is when Lewis performs the lyric "Crash into me / At full speed," that she allows herself to not hold back in her vocal performance, and delivers it with "power and breadth".

== Critical reception ==
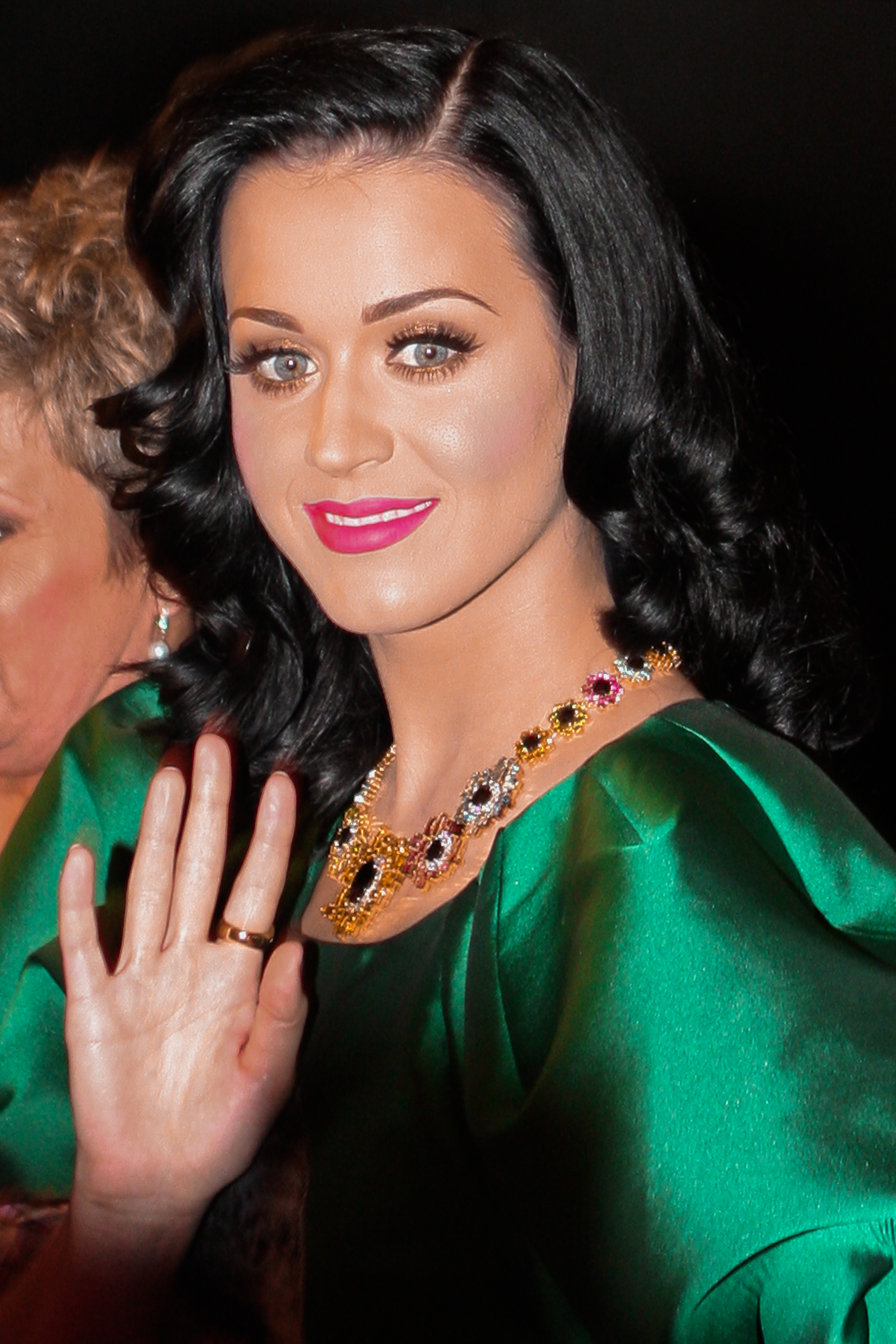
Lewis Corner for Digital Spy compared "Collide" to Katy Perry's "Firework".

Amy Sciarretto for Popcrush was complimentary of Lewis's vocals, writing that she sounds "appealing and captivating," and continued to say that it is what her fans have been waiting for. Sciarretto gave "Collide" a rating of three out of a possible five stars. Lewis Corner for Digital Spy praised the song, writing that Lewis combined her ability to deliver power ballad lyrics into a dance orientated song. Corner compared the song to Katy Perry's "Firework", also produced by Sandy Vee; however, Corner noted that Lewis performs "Collide" in a way which distances the comparison. Katherine St. Asaph for Popdust was critical of the song. Whilst she noted that Lewis was venturing into dance music, where artists such as David Guetta and Kylie Minogue have experienced great success, and that Lewis has an iconic voice compared to both, she felt that the delivery still lacked. St. Asaph wrote "The lethargic, two-note verses make her voice sound less husky than bored, an emotion that a comeback single should never evoke." Michael Cragg for The Guardian felt that the song seemed to build and drop at the wrong times, and that its structure was not cohesive. Cragg continued to say that Lewis does a "passable job as a dance diva," and noted the resemblances between "Collide" and "Penguin".

=== Accolades ===
Year	Ceremony	Award	Result
2012	Grammy Awards	Best Remixed Recording, Non-Classical (Afrojack Remix)	Nominated

== Chart performance ==
"Collide" made its first chart appearance in the United States, where it debuted on the Dance Club Songs at number 32 for the week of 20 August 2011. The following week, an increase in club plays ascended the song to number 22, and to number 16 in its third week. It ascended into the top ten for the week of 17 September 2011, at number six. In its seventh week, "Collide" peaked at number one on 1 October 2011, and was awarded with the Greatest Gainer honour for that week. The song became Lewis's first number one song on the Dance Club Songs chart and only her second song to do so; the first was "Bleeding Love" in May 2008, which peaked at number 11. "Collide" charted at number 46 on Billboard's Hot Dance Club Play songs year-end list. In Ireland, "Collide" debuted at number three on 8 September 2011, and remained in the top ten in its second week, where it charted at number eight. "Collide" was the highest new entry on the Irish Singles Chart for that week.

In Belgium (Flanders), the song peaked at number 13 on 9 September 2011, and remained on that countries singles chart for one month. It also peaked at number six on Belgium's dance chart on 1 October 2011; it remained on the chart for 10 weeks. In the United Kingdom, "Collide" debuted at number four on the UK Singles Chart on 17 September 2011. The following week, it fell to number 10, and again to number 18 in its third week. "Collide" became Lewis's seventh UK Top 5 single, tying her with Olivia Newton-John for British female solo artist with the most UK Top 5 singles. It follows "A Moment Like This" which peaked at number one in 2006 and "Bleeding Love" in 2007. In 2008, the double A-side "Better in Time"/"Footprints in the Sand" peaked at number two, "Forgive Me" peaked at number five and "Run" peaked at number one, while "Happy" peaked at number two in 2009. As of December 2013, Lewis holds the record for British female solo artist with the most UK Top 5 singles, with eight.

The song debuted on the UK Digital Chart at number five. In Scotland, the song debuted at number four on 17 September 2011, and fell by one position to number five the following week. In Austria, "Collide" debuted at number 29 on 23 September 2011, and remained on the chart for an additional two weeks.

== Music video ==
"Collide"'s accompanying music video was directed by Ethan Ladder, and filmed on a beach in Malibu, California. The treatment for the video was described as "a beautiful cinematic piece that will showcase the natural beauty of Leona Lewis. It will be inviting, sexy, and organic. It will be a moving fashion spread. It’s about finding the beauty in the subtleties of life. We are looking for beautiful men and women to help set the tone for this video. These people need to match Leona’s vibe and need to be able to have fun." It was also noted that models applying to be in the video should have an Abercrombie & Fitch style about them, and that "small tattoos" were acceptable. For the most part of the video, Lewis is featured on a beach in a variety of different settings, such as sitting in an old cabriolet car, in which she is surrounded by her friends. Sitting in the car, Lewis wears a polka dot bikini top. Other scenes include Lewis standing in the shallow part of the ocean by herself, as well as sitting around a fire on the beach. As the video progresses, it changes from daytime to nighttime. Ryan Love of Digital Spy praised the video, saying "[the video] sees Lewis show off a new look while chilling with friends throughout the day and into the night." Robbie Daw for Idolator compared the "party in the sand imagery" to Katy Perry's music video for "Teenage Dream".

== Live performances ==
Lewis performed "Collide" for the first time on the first episode of game show Red or Black? The same night, after performing on Red or Black?, Lewis performed "Collide" as part of a mini set-list at London nightclub G-A-Y. Lewis wore a black knee length dress, with a red heart emblem across her chest. Lewis performed "Collide" at Radio 1's Hackney Weekend on 24 May 2012. She performed the song as part of a set list with a cover of Diddy – Dirty Money's "Coming Home", who she was joined on stage with by Wretch 32, "Better in Time", "Come Alive", a new song which she premiered from Glassheart, "Bleeding Love" and "Run", who she was joined on stage with by the Hackney Community Choir. "Collide" was performed as the fourth song on the set list of Lewis' 2013 tour called the Glassheart Tour.

== Track listings ==
- Digital EP
1. "Collide" (Radio Edit) – 3:59
2. "Collide" (Extended Version) – 6:47
3. "Collide" (Afrojack Remix) – 5:53
4. "Collide" (Alex Gaudino and Jason Rooney Remix) – 7:37
5. "Collide" (Cahill Remix) – 6:18
- Glassheart (Deluxe edition)
6. "Collide" (Afrojack Remix) – 5:53

== Credits and personnel ==
Credits adapted from Broadcast Music (BMI).

- Lead vocals – Leona Lewis
- Featured artist – Avicii
- Songwriting – Arash Pournouri, Autumn Rowe, Sandy Wilhelm, Simon Jeffes and Tim Berg
- Production – Sandy Vee, Youngboyz

== Charts and certifications ==
=== Weekly charts ===
Weekly chart performance for "Collide"
Chart (2011–18)	Peak position
Austria (Ö3 Austria Top 40)	29
Belgium Dance (Ultratop 50)	6
Belgium (Ultratip Flanders)	13
Euro Digital Song Sales (Billboard)	6
Euro Digital Tracks (Billboard) Radio edit	6
Ireland (IRMA)	3
Japan Hot 100 (Billboard)	32
Slovakia (Rádio Top 100 Oficiálna)	89
Sweden Heatseeker (Sverigetopplistan)	17
UK Singles (OCC)	4
US Dance Club Songs (Billboard)	1

=== Year-end charts ===
Year-end chart performance for "Collide"
Chart (2011)	Position
UK Singles (OCC)	151
US Dance Club Songs (Billboard)	46

== Certifications ==
Certifications for "Collide"
Region	Certification	Certified units/sales
United Kingdom (BPI)	Silver	200,000^{‡}
^{‡} Sales+streaming figures based on certification alone.

== Radio and release history ==
Release dates and formats for "Collide"
Country	Date	Format	Label
United Kingdom	15 July 2011	Radio premiere	Syco Music; Sony Music
Australia	22 August 2011	Mainstream radio	Sony Music Entertainment
Austria	2 September 2011	Digital download	Sony Music Entertainment
France	2 September 2011	Digital download	Sony Music Entertainment
Ireland	2 September 2011	Digital download	Sony Music Entertainment
Italy	2 September 2011	Digital download	Sony Music Entertainment
Sweden	2 September 2011	Digital download	Sony Music Entertainment
Switzerland	2 September 2011	Digital download	Sony Music Entertainment
United Kingdom	2 September 2011	Digital download	Syco Music
United States	2 September 2011	Digital download	J Records
Germany	16 September 2011	Digital download	Sony Music Entertainment

== See also ==
- List of number-one dance singles of 2011 (U.S.)
