= I See You (Theme from Avatar) =

Song by Leona Lewis

from the album Avatar
- Released: 3 December 2009
- Recorded: 2009
- Genre: Pop
- Length: 4:20
- Label: Atlantic
- Songwriters: James Horner; Kuk Harrell
- Producer: Simon Franglen

Music video
- "Leona Lewis - I See You (Theme from Avatar) [Official Video]" on YouTube

"I See You (Theme from Avatar)" (also referred to as "I See You") is the official theme song recorded by British singer Leona Lewis for the 2009 film Avatar, directed by James Cameron, and its accompanying soundtrack (2009). It was written by James Horner and Kuk Harrell, with production done by Simon Franglen. A pop inspired ballad, the lyrics, which reflect the story line of the film, are about love, emotion and power. The song received multiple comparisons to Celine Dion's "My Heart Will Go On", which is the official theme song written by Horner for another film directed by Cameron, Titanic (1997). Lewis has performed the song on So You Think You Can Dance and Today, and it was included on the set list of her debut concert tour, The Labyrinth (2010). It peaked at number 47 on the Irish Singles Chart and number 24 on the US Adult Contemporary chart.

== Background ==
"I See You" was written by James Horner and Kuk Harrell and produced by Simon Franglen as the official theme song to James Cameron's 2009 film, Avatar. It is the second time that Horner and Franglen have collaborated on a theme song for a film directed by Cameron, the first being "My Heart Will Go On", performed by Celine Dion and used for his 1997 film Titanic. In an interview with Rick Edwards for 4Music called Under the Skin of Leona Lewis, Lewis explained how she became involved with Avatar and recording the theme tune. The singer said that she had known about the project for some period of time as she is very interested in film in general, and that she was approached by Cameron to record Avatar's official theme song. She continued to say that she was very excited about seeing the film, even before her involvement with the film came to be. Cameron invited Lewis to listen to what they had in mind for the song, and upon hearing it, she "immediately wanted to be on board." One of the reasons Lewis gave as to why she accepted the proposal was that a lot of her second studio album, Echo (2009), was inspired by various films, and she thought it would be a great opportunity to appear on a soundtrack.

She described being personally shown how the film was being made by Cameron as one of the highlights of being involved with the film. "I See You" plays during the closing credits of the film. Cameron had intended to have "I See You" released as single, as he thought it was capable of matching the success of Dion's "My Heart Will Go On", however Lewis expressed her reluctancy in the choice as she had only released the lead single from Echo, "Happy", the month before.

== Composition and critical reception ==
"I See You" is a pop ballad, which lasts for a duration of four minutes and 20 seconds. It was composed in the key of A♯ minor using common time and a slow groove at 72 beats per minute, with a melody based on the main Na'vi leitmotif from the film's score. Lewis' vocal range spans two octaves, from the low note of F♯_{3} to the high note of F_{5}, on the song. Ben Child for The Guardian likened the lyrics "I offer my life as a sacrifice and live through your love" to those performed by Dion in "My Heart Will Go On". The lyrics are about encouraging a person to open their eyes and envisage a new and different world, and develop a new way of thinking. According to Lewis, the inspiration behind the song was all of the emotion, love and strength that is displayed by the characters in the film. "I See You" garnered a mixed response from music critics. Brian Linder for IGN praised Horner for asking Lewis to perform "I See You", describing her as a "vocal powerhouse," but was unsure if the song would manage to achieve the same success as Dion's "My Heart Will Go On". J. Hoberman for The Village Voice wrote that the closing credits features Lewis as a "Celine Dion clone singing in Na'vi."

== Accolades ==
Year	Ceremony	Award	Result
2010	Golden Globe Award	Best Original Song	Nominated
2011	Grammy Award	Best Song Written for Visual Media	Nominated

== Promotion ==
The music video for "I See You" was directed by Jake Nava and premiered on Myspace on 15 December 2009. Nava stated that it was important to him to create a world for Lewis to perform in for the video, which he described as "sexy and modern" but also complementary to the film. He continued to say that it need to be "futuristic" but retain the naturalness of what is featured in Avatar. The inspiration for the ultra-violet forest and the light piercing through the canopies of the trees in the video came from the film itself, which were re-created in a controlled studio environment. Nava went to visit Cameron in his studio to choose clips from the film which would be included intercut with Lewis in the video.

Lewis performed "I See You" for the first time on the season six series finale of So You Think You Can Dance in the United States on 16 December 2009. On 14 January 2010, she performed the song on Today and gave an interview about how she became involved with the project. It was included as the second song on the set list of her debut concert tour, called The Labyrinth (2010). It was later included on the DVD release of the tour, called The Labyrinth Tour: Live from the O2. Lewis performed "I See You" in the second section of the set list, along with "Can't Breathe", "Forgive Me" and "Happy". Lewis wore "an amazing peacock blue ballgown on a sparkling stage." The singer performed "I See You" and "Bleeding Love" at China's 2013 New Year Gala.

== Track listing ==
Avatar: Music from the Motion Picture

14. "I See You (Theme from Avatar)" [Album only] – 4:20

The Labyrinth Tour: Live from the O2

6. "I See You" (Live from the O2) – 2:41

Remixes

1. "I See You" (Cosmic Gate Club Mix) – 7:36

== Credits and personnel ==
- Lead vocals – Leona Lewis
- Songwriting – James Horner, Kuk Harrell
- Production – Simon Franglen
- Mixing – Dave Pensado

Credits adapted from The Guardian.

== Charts ==
In Ireland, "I See You" debuted at number 47 for the week of 15 January 2010. Two weeks later on 28 January 2010, the song re-entered the chart at number 48. In the United States, the song peaked at number 24 on the US Adult Contemporary chart.

Chart (2010)	Peak position
Ireland (IRMA)	47
US Adult Contemporary (Billboard)	24
