= Outta My Head (Leona Lewis song) =

Song by Leona Lewis

from the album Echo
- Studio: Maratone, Stockholm, Sweden; Germano, New York City
- Genre: Dance-pop; electropop
- Length: 3:39
- Label: J; Sony; Syco
- Songwriters: Savan Kotecha; Max Martin; Johan Schuster
- Producers: Max Martin; Shellback

Audio video
- "Outta My Head" on YouTube

"Outta My Head" is a song recorded by British singer-songwriter Leona Lewis for her second studio album Echo (2009). The track was written by Savan Kotecha, Max Martin and Johan "Shellback" Schuster, and produced by the latter two. It is an electropop song with Eurodance influences, and its compositional structure is noticeably different from the other songs on Echo. The instrumentation consists of keyboard riffs and beats, instead of pianos and guitars which are used on the other songs. The chorus of "Outta My Head" was compared to the works of Australian singer Kylie Minogue and German group Cascada due to its Eurodance style. It debuted and peaked at number 98 on the Slovak Singles Chart upon the release of Echo. Lewis has performed the song on Jimmy Kimmel Live! and it was included on the set list of her debut concert tour, The Labyrinth (2010).

== Recording and composition ==
"Outta My Head" was written by Savan Kotecha, Max Martin and Shellback, with production done by the latter two, for Lewis's second studio album, Echo (2009). It was recorded by Ann Miniceli at Maratone Studios in Stockholm, Sweden, and at Germano Studios in New York. She was assisted in the process by Christian Baker. It was mixed by Serban Genea at MixStar Studios in Virginia Beach, Virginia. The Pro Tools engineer for the mixing was John Hanes, and his assistant was Tim Roberts. "Outta My Head" is an electropop song with Eurodance influences which lasts for a duration of three minutes and 39 seconds; it appears as the fifth song on the standard United Kingdom track list of Echo. On the US edition, it runs for one second less and is included as the sixth track. The instrumentation of "Outta My Head" is different from the rest of the songs on Echo and does not follow the same styles of production. Instead of using pianos and guitars, it employs "stuttering keyboard riffs" and "cheap beats". The lyrics of the song contain a "F**k you!" sentiment.

"Outta My Head" moves at a tempo of 130 beats per minute in the key of C major. Lewis' vocals span from G_{3} to A_{5}. The song follows a chord progression of F–C–Em.

== Critical reception ==
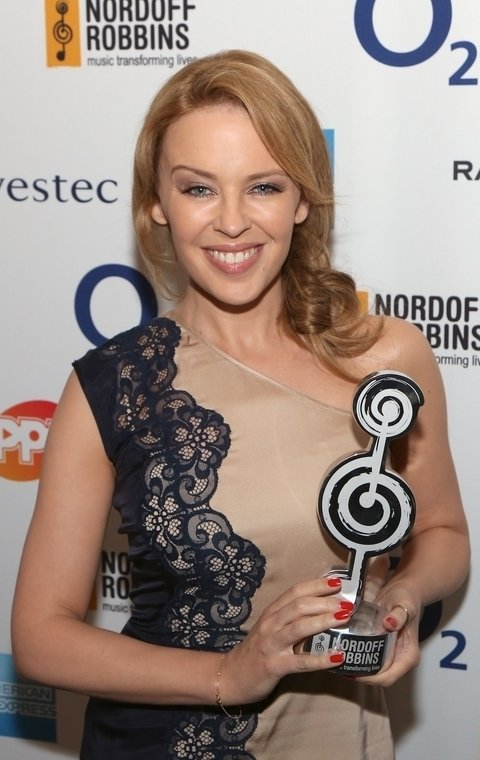
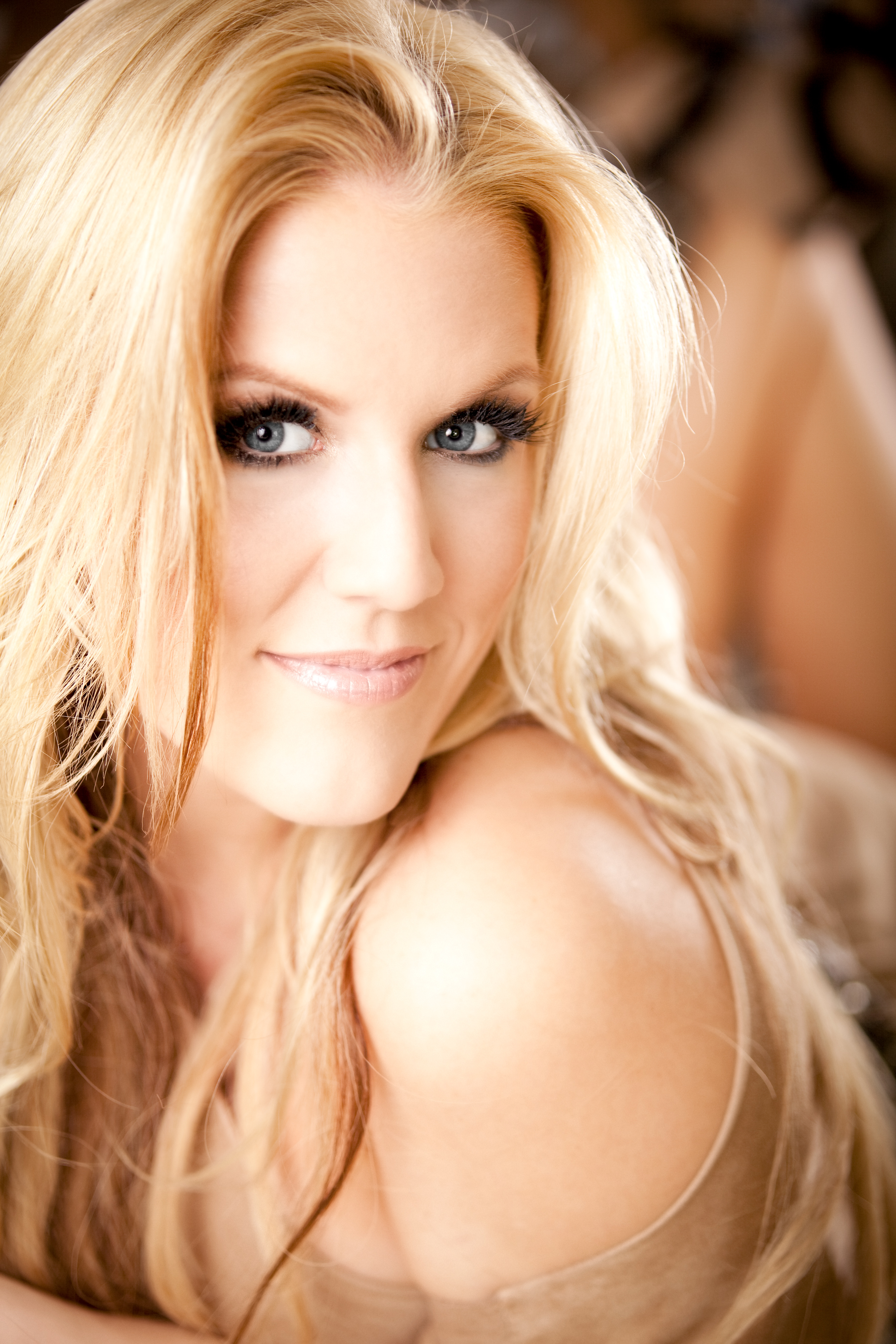
The chorus of "Outta My Head" was compared to the works of Australian singer Kylie Minogue (left) and German group Cascada (right) due to its Eurodance style.

"Outta My Head" garnered mixed reviews from music critics. Nick Levine for Digital Spy described "Outta My Head" as a "genuine surprise" because of its uptempo style and how different it is to the rest of the songs on Echo, which Levine thought often sounded the same from song to song. He further wrote that the chorus is something which would suit German Eurodance group Cascada. Writing for The Independent, Andy Gill praised the song for its "fast, juddering" style and wrote that it is the edgiest song on the album. Although, he thought that it did not deviate from "the chunky, machine-like reliability" which is present on the rest of Echo. Michael Cragg for musicOMH complimented the song for lifting Echo's overall feel of being "mundane", and that it is an "obvious highlight" of the album. He continued to write that the chorus is "brilliantly camp" and would be well suited to Kylie Minogue. Nate Chinen for The New York Times thought that Lewis was trying to show musical relevance with songs such as "Outta My Head" and "Love Letter", but achieves it with mixed results. "But Ms. Lewis strives for relevance here too, with mixed results. "Love Letter" is Kelly Clarkson without the spunk; "Outta My Head" is Lady Gaga without the smirk."

Mike Diver for BBC Music thought that the song represents "cheesy" Eurodance and almost achieves being a credible dance song, if it was not for the slightly " too cheap-sounding, too tinny of production". As part of his review of Echo, Matthew Cole for Slant Magazine wrote that he was unimpressed by the "novelty" of Lewis' impressive vocals, writing that she uses the higher registers of her voice too much. "The fact that Lewis can sing isn't a novelty here—it's the premise of the album. On nearly every track she can be found cooing impossibly high melodies over bouncing club beats ('Can't Breathe,' 'Outta My Head') or imbuing the ballads with thick, powerful choruses to match their outsized string arrangements ('Broken'). Hugh Montgomery, writing for The Guardian, was critical of the song, writing that it is the "only serious misfire" on the album and that it confirms how "Lewis does sexy and upbeat like Jedward do singing in tune." Although he thought Lewis' vocals are "technically unimpeachable" on "Outta My Head", it is the artistry behind it which fails to deliver.

== Live performances ==
Lewis performed "Outta My Head" for the first time live on Jimmy Kimmel Live! on 25 November 2009 in the United States. She also performed the lead single from the album, "Happy". The song was included as the seventeenth song on the set list of her debut concert tour, called The Labyrinth (2010). It was later included on the DVD release of the tour, The Labyrinth Tour: Live from the O2. Lewis performed the song in the last section of the set list, along with a cover of Eurythmics "Sweet Dreams (Are Made of This)" and Lewis' version of "Run".

== Track listing ==
Standard edition

5. "Outta My Head" – 3:39

United States standard version

6. "Outta My Head" – 3:38

== Credits and personnel ==
Recording

- Recorded at Maratone Studios, Stockholm, Sweden; Germano Studios, New York.
- Mixed at MixStar Studios, Virginia Beach, VA.

Personnel

- Songwriting – Savan Kotecha, Max Martin, Shellback
- Production – Max Martin, Shellback
- Vocal recording – Ann Miniceli
- Vocal recording assistant – Christian Baker
- Mixing – Serban Genea
- Pro-Tools engineer for mixing – John Hanes
- Pro-Tools engineer for mixing assistant – Tim Roberts

Credits adapted from the liner notes of Echo.

== Chart performance ==
For the week beginning 14 December 2009, "Outta My Head" debuted and peaked at number 98 on the Slovak Singles Chart.

Chart (2009)	Peak position
Slovakia (IFPI)	98
