= Glassheart Tour =

2013 concert tour by Leona Lewis

- Tour by Leona Lewis
- Location: Europe
- Associated album: Glassheart
- Start date: 15 April 2013
- End date: 13 July 2013
- Legs: 1
- No. of shows: 24 in Europe

Leona Lewis concert chronology
- The Labyrinth (2010); Glassheart Tour (2013); I Am Tour (2016)

The Glassheart Tour was the second headlining concert tour by English singer Leona Lewis. It was launched in support of her third studio album, Glassheart (2012). Announced on 8 October 2012, with an initial run of sixteen dates in the United Kingdom, the Glassheart Tour was extended to include five dates in Germany and one in Switzerland. English singer-songwriter Ryan Keen served as the support act. It marks the first time that Lewis has performed material in Europe as part of a headline tour; her previous tour The Labyrinth (2010), only visited the UK.

Lewis was inspired by American hip hop artist and music producer Kanye West's style of performance and noted English playwright William Shakespeare as inspiration for the tour. Lewis performed the set list with her band which consisted mostly of a string quartet and acoustic song arrangements. It was the acoustic performances and Lewis' vocals that garnered the most praise from critics; however, there was a mixed reaction to some of the arrangements such as the reggae influences on "Better in Time". Critics were also divided over the lack of diversity from previous live performances though Lewis' stage presence was commended.

== Background and development ==
Lewis released her third studio album Glassheart on 12 October 2012, almost a year after the original release date of November 2011. The album had been conceptualised in July 2010, following Lewis' completion of her first tour, The Labyrinth. The album title Glassheart was inspired from a conversation that Lewis had with Ryan Tedder. During the conversation, Tedder asked Lewis about her past experiences with love and life in general. Lewis' response led him to the word "Glassheart." During an interview with Clyde 1 radio, Lewis said "Glassheart represents protecting your heart, yourself and protecting your emotions, its very poignant". On 8 October 2012, a week before the album's UK release, Lewis announced her supporting tour of the same name. The tour is named after the album, and although Lewis said she is not American hip hop artist and music producer Kanye West's "biggest fan", she was inspired by his tour performances where he appeared on stage alone and just "did his thing".

During an interview with Digital Spy, Lewis told Tom Eames that Glassheart has a running theme about "star-crossed lovers that can't be together", and so it was likely that this idea would feature on the tour. Lewis also cited William Shakespeare as another source of inspiration. She spent the three days of the final tour rehearsals at The Backstage Centre in Purfleet, Essex (UK). The Glassheart Tour was scheduled to visit twenty-one venues across Germany and the United Kingdom. The tour was expected to begin on 15 April in Berlin. The list had expanded from an initial sixteen to include five dates in Germany. Lewis would then proceed with UK dates beginning in Glasgow, including two dates at London's Royal Albert Hall before finishing on 18 May in Plymouth. Speaking about the tour, Lewis said "I can't wait to get out there and play my new songs. I had such fun on my last tour and I'm really excited about doing it again next year." Barclaycard ran a competition which gave fans the chance to win tickets to 6 May concert at Birmingham's National Indoor Arena.

== Critics' reviews ==
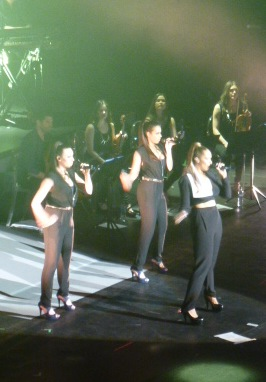
Lewis performing "Better in Time"/"Man Down" at the Royal Albert Hall on 9 May 2013.

In a review for the Express & Star, Elizabeth Joyce said although Lewis was not like her contemporaries: "meat dress-wearing" Lady Gaga or the Russell Brand-marrying Katy Perry, "no one can reach those soft lows or soaring highs quite like her". Joyce praised the concert for showing the best of Lewis' vocal abilities. Focussing predominately on songs from Spirit (2007) and Glassheart (2012), the concert was largely acoustic music with a band and string quartet. In particular Joyce praised Lewis' performances of "First Time Ever I Saw Your Face" and "Bleeding Love" which earned her standing ovations, in addition to the "note perfect" rendition of "Run". Katherine Hollisey-McLean for the Worthing Herald largely agreed, commenting that if anyone expected Lewis to be "belting out song after song" they were right. Hollisey-McLean praised the decisions to switch the song arrangements, for example adding reggae beats to "Better in Time" and performing the acoustic version of "Trouble". She ended by saying that Lewis' vocals were "flawless" and that her stage presence and confidence had vastly improved over the last seven years.

The Guardian's Malcolm Jack was less impressed; he stated that when Lewis tried to diversify the show by dancing or switching the arrangements, she risked becoming the British diva that pop music forgot. Jack said that during a "sassy dance routine" for "Forgive Me" Lewis came off as a "budget Beyoncé", whilst on the "cringey windin' and grindin' reggae take on 'Better in Time' song" she comes across like a "reasonably priced Rihanna". Jack concluded by saying the show was in need of a shot of "adrenaline". In writing for the Nottingham Post, Paul Hindle agreed, saying that when the tempo increased and choreography was introduced "Lewis looked endearingly uncomfortable"; however, Hindle was positive about Lewis' vocals, calling her vocal performance "virtuoso". He concluded that Lewis' "spellbinding rendition" of "Run" was a highlight of the concert, and that fans should not have left disappointed.

== Set list ==
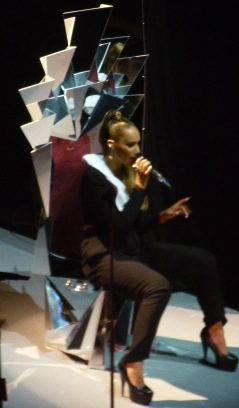
Lewis performing "I to You" at the Royal Albert Hall on 9 May 2013

The following set list is representative of the show in Berlin. It is not intended to represent the all shows throughout the tour.

1. "Come Alive"
2. "Fireflies"
3. "A Moment Like This"
4. "Collide"
5. "Forgive Me"
6. "Better in Time" (contains elements of "Man Down")
7. "Happy"
8. "Sugar"
9. "I to You"
10. "Broken"
11. "Trouble"
12. "Locked Out of Heaven"
13. "Footprints in the Sand"
14. "The First Time Ever I Saw Your Face"
15. "Bleeding Love"
16. "Glassheart"
17. "Run"

Notes

- Lewis performed "Diamonds" in Scarborough on 12 July 2013.

== Shows ==
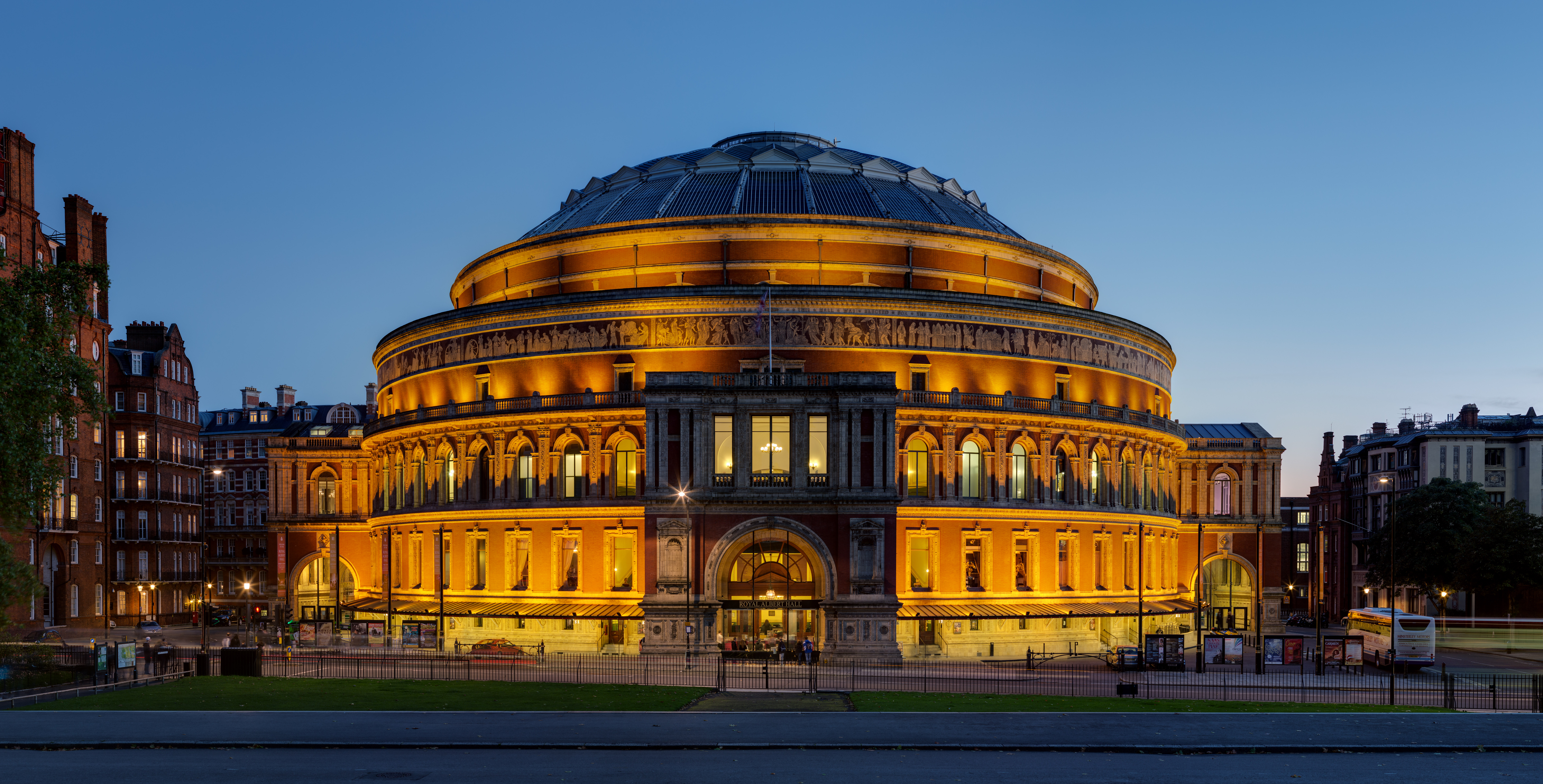
Lewis performed two concerts at the Royal Albert Hall in London.

List of concerts, showing date, city, country, venue, opening act, tickets sold, number of available tickets and amount of gross revenue
Date	City	Country	Venue	Opening act
15 April 2013	Berlin	Germany	Tempodrom	Ryan Keen
16 April 2013	Frankfurt	Germany	Jahrhunderthalle	Ryan Keen
18 April 2013	Düsseldorf	Germany	Mitsubishi Electric Halle	Ryan Keen
19 April 2013	Hamburg	Germany	Congress Center Hamburg	Ryan Keen
21 April 2013	Munich	Germany	Philharmonie	Ryan Keen
22 April 2013	Luzern	Switzerland	KKL	Ryan Keen
26 April 2013	Glasgow	Scotland	Clyde Auditorium	Ryan Keen
27 April 2013	Edinburgh	Scotland	Edinburgh Playhouse	Ryan Keen
29 April 2013	Ipswich	England	Regent Theatre	Ryan Keen
30 April 2013	Nottingham	England	Nottingham Royal Concert Hall	Ryan Keen
2 May 2013	Newcastle	England	Newcastle City Hall	Ryan Keen
3 May 2013	Sheffield	England	Sheffield City Hall	Ryan Keen
5 May 2013	Brighton	England	Brighton Centre	Ryan Keen
6 May 2013	Birmingham	England	National Indoor Arena	Ryan Keen
8 May 2013	London	England	Royal Albert Hall	Ryan Keen
9 May 2013	London	England	Royal Albert Hall	Ryan Keen
11 May 2013	Oxford	England	New Theatre Oxford	Ryan Keen
12 May 2013	Cardiff	Wales	Motorpoint Arena Cardiff	Ryan Keen
14 May 2013	Manchester	England	Manchester Apollo	Ryan Keen
15 May 2013	Liverpool	England	Echo Arena	Ryan Keen
17 May 2013	Bournemouth	England	International Centre	Ryan Keen
18 May 2013	Plymouth	England	Plymouth Pavilions	Ryan Keen
12 July 2013	Scarborough	England	Scarborough Open Air Theatre	None
13 July 2013	Kew Gardens	England	Royal Botanic Gardens	None
