= Whatever It Takes (Leona Lewis song) =

Song by Leona Lewis

from the album Spirit
- Studio: DARP Studios, Atlanta, GA; Doppler Studios, Atlanta, GA; Battery Studios, New York City
- Genre: Gospel-pop
- Length: 3:27
- Label: J; Sony; Syco
- Songwriters: Leona Lewis; Novel Stevenson; Tony Reyes
- Producers: Novel; Dallas Austin

Audio video
- "Whatever It Takes" on YouTube

"Whatever It Takes" is a song by British singer-songwriter Leona Lewis from her debut studio album, Spirit (2007). Lewis co-wrote it with Tony Reyes and Novel; the latter also co-produced it with Dallas Austin. It was the first song to be written for Spirit and one of only two songs on the album to involve Lewis in the writing process. It is a gospel-pop-influenced track. The song garnered a mixed response from music critics; it was praised for its upbeat instrumentation but criticised for lacking any "kick". Upon the release of Spirit, the song debuted at number 61 on the UK Singles Chart due to strong digital download sales. Lewis has performed the song at the 2010 Rock in Rio and on her debut concert tour, The Labyrinth. It was later included on the subsequent DVD release called The Labyrinth Tour: Live from the O2.

== Recording and production ==
Co-written by Lewis with Novel and Tony Reyes, "Whatever It Takes" was recorded at DARP Studios and Doppler Studios, both located in Atlanta, Georgia and at Battery Studios in New York City, by Carlton Lynn. Lynn was assisted in the recording process by Lloyd Cooper (at Doppler Studios) and Tim Sturges (at Battery Studios). It was also mixed by Lynn at DARP Studios; Josh Houghkirk served as the assistant mixer. The song was produced by Novel and Dallas Austin. A variety of instrumentalists were enlisted for the production of "Whatever It Takes": Eddie Horst was the string arranger, while Kenn Wagner, Olga Shiptko, Amy Chang and William Pu performed violins, Karen Freer and Daniel Laufer provided cello and co-writer Reyes played the guitar. Stephen Lowman and Stephen Ferrera performed drums, while Novel played the keyboard. "Whatever It Takes" makes use of a choir, which consists of Tawatha Agee, Vanesse Thomas, Cindy Mizelle, Michelle Cobbs, Robin Clark, "Bibi" Straughn, Tammy Lucas, Billy Porter, Bennie Diggs and Fonzi Thornton; Thornton was enlisted as the vocal contractor. Lewis provides background vocals on the track, and the production process was overseen by Kimberly L. Smith. As she introduced the track before performing it on her debut concert tour The Labyrinth (2010), Lewis revealed that "Whatever It Takes" was the first song to be written for Spirit.

== Composition and critical reception ==
"Whatever It Takes" is an upbeat, midtempo gospel-pop song which lasts for a duration of 3:27. The song was composed in the key of E♭ major using common time at 96 beats per minute. Lewis' vocal range spans over two octaves from low note of B♭_{3} to the high note of B♭_{5}. The song garnered a mixed response from music critics. Nate Chinen for The New York Times was complimentary of "Whatever It Takes", writing that it is an "upbeat anthem." Nick Levine was for Digital Spy wrote "'Whatever It Takes' is anchored by a rhythm track that wouldn't shame a boy-racer cruising through Harlem in his pimped-up ride." However, he noted that "Whatever It Takes" and "Best You Never Had" were Spirit's only uptempo moments, and that Lewis tries to emulate her contemporaries too closely. Kitty Empire for The Guardian was critical of the song, writing that "Not even Dallas Austin – who has worked with Sugababes – can make 'Whatever It Takes' any fun."

== Live performances ==
Lewis performed "Whatever It Takes" at the Rock in Rio festival held in Lisbon on 22 May 2010. It was also included as the fourth song on the set list of The Labyrinth. It was later included on the DVD release of the tour, called The Labyrinth Tour: Live from the O2. Lewis performed the song in the first section of the set list, along with "Brave" as the opener, "Don't Let Me Down", "Better in Time" and "Take a Bow". The set was decorated in the style of a castle; acrobats performed as they were hanging from the ceiling on large pieces of fabric while Lewis wore a gold sequined dress and thigh-high boots.

== Track listing ==
Spirit standard/deluxe edition

2. "Whatever It Takes" – 3:27

Spirit United States standard/deluxe version

10. "Whatever It Takes" – 3:27

The Labyrinth Tour: Live from the O2

5. "Whatever It Takes" (Live from the 02) – 3:26

== Credits and personnel ==
Recording

- Recorded at DARP Studios, Atlanta, GA; Doppler Studios, Atlanta, GA; Battery Studios, NYC.
- Mixed at DARP Studios, Atlanta, GA.

Personnel

- Songwriting – Novel Stevenson, Tony Reyes, Leona Lewis
- Production – Novel, Dallas Austin
- Vocal recording – Carlton Lynn
- Assistant vocal recording – Lloyd Cooper (at Doppler Studios), Tim Sturges (at Battery Studios)
- Mixing – Carlton Lynn
- Assistant mixing – Josh Houghkirk
- String arrangement – Eddie Horst
- Violins – Kenn Wagner, Olga Shiptko, Amy Chang, William Pu
- Cello – Karen Freer, Daniel Laufer
- Guitars – Tony Reyes
- Drums – Stephen Lowman, Stephen Ferrera
- Keyboards and programming – Novel
- Choir – Tawatha Agee, Vanesse Thomas, Cindy Mizelle, Michelle Cobbs, Robin Clark, Biti Strauchn, Tammy Lucas, Billy Porter, Bennie Diggs, Fonzi Thornton
- Vocal contraction – Fonzi Thornton
- Background vocals – Leona Lewis
- Project coordinator – Kimberly L. Smith

Credits adapted from the liner notes of Spirit.

== Charts ==
Upon the release of Spirit, "Whatever It Takes" debuted at number 61 on the strength of digital download sales in the chart issue released on 24 November 2007.

| Chart (2007) | Peak position |
|---|---|
| UK Singles (OCC) | 61 |
