= Take a Bow (Leona Lewis song) =

2007 song by Leona Lewis

Song by Leona Lewis

from the album Spirit
- Studio: The Record Plant, Hollywood, California
- Genre: R&B
- Length: 3:54
- Label: J; Sony; Syco
- Songwriters: Jordon Omley; Michael Mani; Wayne Wilkins; Louis Biancaniello; Ryan Tedder
- Producers: The Runaways; Sam Watters; Wayne Wilkins; Louis Biancaniello; Ryan "Alias" Tedder

Audio video
- "Take a Bow" on YouTube

"Take a Bow" is a song recorded by British singer Leona Lewis for her debut studio album Spirit (2007). It was written by Jordon Omley, Michael Mani, Wayne Wilkins, Louis Biancaniello and Ryan Tedder. Tedder explained that he wanted to create an edgy song for Lewis so that it would not be boring or predictable. A Contemporary R&B and urban song, the lyrics focus the failure of a relationship. Its composition features an Ebb and Flo groove and received several comparisons to "Cry Me a River" by Justin Timberlake.

"Take a Bow" received positive reviews from music critics. Most praised the production as unexpected and different but one felt it overshadowed Lewis' vocals. Upon the release of Spirit, the song debuted at number 97 on the UK Singles Chart due to strong digital download sales. Lewis performed "Take a Bow" at the Rock in Rio festival and on her 2010 concert tour, The Labyrinth.

== Recording and production ==
"Take a Bow" was conceived during recording sessions for Lewis' debut studio album, Spirit, which was released in November 2007. It was written by Jordon Omley, Michael Mani, Wayne Wilkins, Louis Biancaniello and Ryan Tedder, and was produced by The Runaways, Sam Watters, Wilkins, Biancaniello and Tedder. The music production, keyboards and programming were carried out by Wilkins, Biancaniello and Tedder, while vocal production was helmed by Watters. Lewis performs the lead vocals, and ReVaughn Brown performs background vocals. "Take a Bow" was recorded and mixed by Biancaniello, Mani, Watters and Omley at The Record Plant, Hollywood, California. As reported by Digital Spy, Tedder revealed that the types of songs that people expected to hear on Spirit, such as powerful vocal performance ballads, needed to be different and stand out rather than conventional, "if you're going to push that kind of music [these days] – big ballads and big songs – you have to be edgier; they can't be clean and polished."

== Composition and critical reception ==
"Take a Bow" is a contemporary R&B and urban music song, which lasts for a duration of 3:54, and appears as the sixth track on the standard and deluxe versions of the album. On the North American track listing, the song appears as the eleventh track and last for a duration of 3:53. Its instrumentation consists of "daring, machine-made" pan pipes, "melodramatic" synths, a piano and a guitar. It features an Ebb and Flo groove, and was composed in the key of A minor using common time at 70 beats per minute. Lewis' vocal range spans over two octaves from low note of A_{3} to the high note of Eb_{6}. The song's opening lyrics are "The flowers are faded now, along with your letters." Chad Grischow for IGN and Sarah Rodman for The Boston Globe compared the song's production to Justin Timberlake's song "Cry Me a River" (2002). The lyrics of "Take A Bow" pertain to a failed relationship, which Nick Levine for Digital Spy described as "admirably stark."

"Take a Bow" garnered a positive response from music critics. Nick Levine for Digital Spy described the track as "unexpected" due to its urban edge. Sarah Rodman for The Boston Globe wrote it was a "contender" to be released as a single because of how it is a mix of "classic and au courant" music. Linda McGee for RTÉ was complimentary of Lewis decision to experiment with the song instead of taking a "slushy ballad" approach and remaining in her comfort zone. She continued to write that it is for this reason that she is more suited to "the Beyoncé end of the market than the Mariah end." Kitty Empire for The Guardian noted that all of the songs on Spirit are love songs, but only "Take a Bow" feels like it is from the 21st century. Chad Grischow for IGN wrote that the "Take a Bow"'s production distracted from Lewis' vocal performance.

== Live performances ==
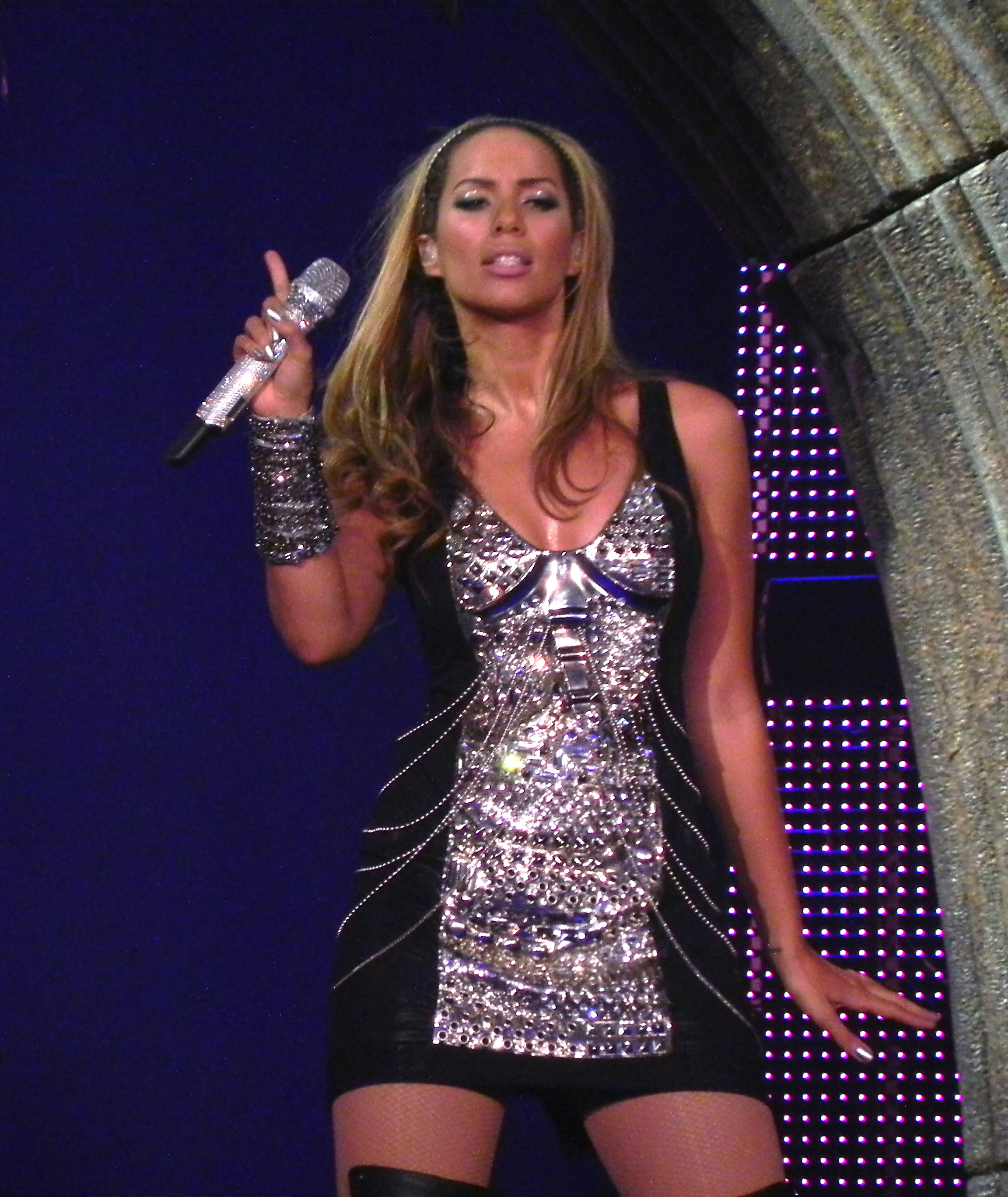
Lewis performing "Take a Bow" on The Labyrinth tour.

Lewis performed "Take a Bow" at the Rock in Rio festival held in Lisbon on 22 May 2010. "Take a Bow" was included as the fifth song on the set list of her debut concert tour, called The Labyrinth (2010). It was later included on the tour's DVD release The Labyrinth Tour: Live from the O2. Lewis performed the song in the first section of the set list, along with "Brave" as the opener, "Don't Let Me Down", "Better in Time" and "Whatever It Takes". The set was decorated in the style of a castle; acrobats performed as they were hanging from the ceiling on large pieces of fabric while Lewis wore a gold sequined dress and thigh high boots.

== Track listing ==
Spirit standard/deluxe edition

6. "Take a Bow" – 3:54

Spirit United States standard/deluxe version

11. "Take a Bow" – 3:53

The Labyrinth Tour: Live from the O2

5. "Take a Bow" (Live from the 02) – 5:41

== Credits and personnel ==
Recording

- Recorded and mixed at The Record Plant, Hollywood, California.

Personnel

- Lead vocals – Leona Lewis
- Background vocals – RaVaughn Brown
- Songwriting – Jordon Omley, Michael Mani, Wayne Wilkins, Louis Biancaniello, Ryan Tedder
- Production – The Runaways, Sam Watters, Wayne Wilkins, Louis Biancaniello, Ryan "Alias" Tedder
- Music production – Wayne Wilkins, Louis Biancaniello, Ryan "Alias" Tedder
- Recording and mixing – Louis Biancaniello, Michael Mani, Sam Watters, Jordon Omley
- Vocal production – Sam Watters
- Keyboards and programming – Wayne Wilkins, Louis Biancaniello, Ryan "Alias" Tedder

Credits adapted from the liner notes of Spirit.

== Chart ==
Upon the release of Spirit, "Take a Bow" debuted at number 97 on the strength of digital download sales in the chart issue released on 24 November 2007.

Chart (2007)	Peak position
UK Singles (Official Charts Company)	97
