= The Labyrinth Tour: Live from the O2 =

Live album by Leona Lewis
- Released: 29 November 2010
- Recorded: 18 June 2010; The O_{2} Arena (Greenwich, London, England)
- Genres: Pop; soul; R&B
- Labels: Syco; Sony Music

Leona Lewis chronology
Echo (2009)	The Labyrinth Tour: Live from the O2 (2010)	Glassheart (2012)

Professional ratings
Review scores
Source	Rating
Allmusic	4/5 stars

The Labyrinth Tour: Live from the O2 is a live and first video album by English singer Leona Lewis and was recorded on 18 June 2010 in London, while Lewis performed at her tour The Labyrinth. It was released on 29 November 2010 with a 10 track live CD, and a Blu-ray version was also released. The recording was broadcast on UK television channel Watch on 3 December 2010. It entered the Official UK Music Video Chart at number 4 on 5 December 2010. It has thus far spent 12 weeks in the UK Top 10.

== Track listing ==
The track listing announced on 3 November 2010.

DVD

1. "Brave"
2. "Don't Let Me Down"
3. "Better in Time"
4. "Whatever It Takes"
5. "Take a Bow"
6. "Video Interlude: Ride a White Swan"
7. "I See You"
8. "Can't Breathe"
9. "Forgive Me"
10. "Happy"
11. "Could It Be Magic"
12. "I Got You"
13. "Cry Me a River"
14. "The First Time Ever I Saw Your Face"
15. "Homeless"
16. "Video Interlude: They Don't Care About Us"
17. "Outta My Head"
18. "Sweet Dreams (Are Made of This)"
19. "Run"
20. "Bleeding Love"

CD

1. "Brave"
2. "Don't Let Me Down"
3. "Better in Time"
4. "Whatever It Takes"
5. "Happy"
6. "The First Time Ever I Saw Your Face"
7. "Outta My Head"
8. "Sweet Dreams (Are Made of This)"
9. "Run"
10. "Bleeding Love"
11. "Cry Me a River" (Japanese bonus track)
12. "Could It Be Magic" (Japanese bonus track)

== Charts ==
DVDs Chart (2010)	Peak position
Irish Top 10 Music DVDs	5
UK Music Video Chart	4
Spain Top 20 DVD	18
CD Chart (2010)	Peak position
South Korean International Albums (Gaon)	22
Swiss Music Charts	59
German Album Charts	63

== Certifications ==
Region	Certification	Certified units/sales
United Kingdom (BPI) Video	Gold	25,000^{*}
^{*} Sales figures based on certification alone.

== Credits and personnel ==
Taken and adapted from The Labyrinth Official Tour Programme.

Performers

- Lead vocals – Leona Lewis
- Support act – Gabriella Cilmi

Management

- Management (Modest!) – Nicola Carson, Richard Griffiths, Harry Magee
- Director – William Baker
- Assistant show director – Emma Bull
- Tour manager – Steve Martin
- Production – Steve Levit (Production North)
- Agent – David Zedeck (CAA)

Music

- Musical director – Paul Beard
- Guitar – Graham Kearns, Luke Potashnick
- Bass – Chris Brown
- Drums – Carlos Hurcules
- Background vocals – Adetoun Anibi, Zalika King

Choreography

- Choreographer – Jermaine Browne
- Assistant Choreographer – Rachel Kay
- Dance captain – Jerry Reeve
- Dancers – Dennish Jauch, Jamie Karitzis, Jay Revell, Manew Sauls-Addison,
  Kate Collins, Briony Albert

Aerial performers

- Aerial artistic director & choreographer – Dreya Webber
- Aerialists – Alexandra Apjarova, Shannon Beach, Sal Vallasso, Davide Zongoli

Stage and costumes

- Stage set designer – Alan Macdonald
- Prop designer – Nicoline Refsing
- Lighting Designers – Nick Whitehouse, Baz Halpin
- Lighting Director – Graham Feast
- Head of security – Paul Higgins
- Hair stylist – Ben Cooke
- Make up – Jane Bradley
- Leona's head stylist – Allison Edmond
- Head stylist and costume designer – Stevie Stewart
- Stylists' assistant – Kate Jinkerson
- Leona's costume maker – Marco Morante
- Tour assistant – Alice Martin
