= Footprints in the Sand (Leona Lewis song) =

Single by Leona Lewis

from the album Spirit
- A-side: "Better in Time"
- B-side: "You Bring Me Down"
- Released: 9 March 2008
- Recorded: 2007
- Studio: Rokstone (London, England)
- Genre: Pop; R&B
- Length: 4:09
- Label: Sony BMG; Syco
- Songwriters: Richard Page; Per Magnusson; David Kreuger; Simon Cowell
- Producer: Steve Mac

Leona Lewis singles chronology
"Bleeding Love" (2007)	"Better in Time" / "Footprints in the Sand" (2008)	"Forgive Me" (2008)

"Footprints in the Sand" is a song recorded by British singer Leona Lewis for her debut studio album Spirit (2007). It was written by Simon Cowell, David Kreuger, Per Magnusson, Richard Page, with production handled by Steve Mac. Sony BMG and Syco Music released it digitally in the United Kingdom on 9 March 2008 as her third single, being launched as a double A-side with "Better in Time", and "You Bring Me Down" as the single B-side, and was physically released the next day.

It is an R&B and pop song composed at a tempo of sixty beats per minute. It was written in one day at Page's home in Malibu, California, with Cowell suggesting the idea to base it on the Christian poem "Footprints". The single's music video was filmed by British director Sophie Muller in Johannesburg, South Africa. The video depicts social problems within the city, but ends with a message of hope. "Footprints in the Sand" became the official theme of the 2008 version of biennial charity programme Sport Relief, organised by the BBC.

The song received positive reviews from music critics, some of them noting its gospel sounds and with critics comparing Lewis's vocals to American R&B singer Mariah Carey. "Footprints in the Sand" charted as a separate single in Ireland, the United Kingdom and the European Hot 100 Singles, receiving a silver certification in the UK by the British Phonographic Industry (BPI). The double A-side ranked in Germany and Switzerland, and was certified platinum by the BPI. In 2008, Lewis performed the song for the first time in the UK live on the television programme Dancing on Ice. She later promoted it on her Glassheart (2013) and I Am (2016) tours. The song has been covered by multiple TV show contestants, including Lucie Jones, Bindi Irwin, and Voices of Service.

== Production and composition ==
"Footprints in the Sand" was written by Simon Cowell, David Kreuger, Per Magnusson and Richard Page, whilst the production was helmed by Steve Mac. It was recorded in 2007 at Rokstone Studios in London, England. Cowell originally came up with the idea to base a song around the Christian poem "Footprints", and suggested it to Kreuger and Magnusson. They had a scheduled session at Page's home in Malibu, California, and finished the song the next day. Cowell received a songwriting credit for coming up with the concept. In an interview with HitQuarters, Magnusson said they had thought the song would be perfect for the Irish boy band Westlife, but it was offered to British singer Leona Lewis instead. When Cowell mentioned the song concept to Lewis, she agreed that it could be "really quite interesting". Regarding the song, Lewis commented: "Originally it was a poem; it's very inspirational so we put it into a song. I think it is very moving, with a very emotional lyric and I really love to sing this song". She added that the poem "[is] about standing by someone and being there for people who need your help."

"Footprints in the Sand" was included on Lewis's debut studio album Spirit, which was released in 2007 on Syco and J Records. The song has a duration of 4:09 and was composed using common time in the key of A♭ major at a larghetto tempo of sixty beats per minute; Lewis's vocals spanned from the low note of E♭_{3} to the high note of G♯_{5}. The song follows the sequence of A♭_{5}–A♭_{5}/B♭–Fm_{7}–E♭ in the verses and A♭–B♭–B♭m–Fm–G♭–D♭ in the chorus as its chord progression. It incorporates four instruments: keyboard instruments (piano, organ and synthesizers), guitar, bass and drums, and features backing choir vocals by The Tuff Session Singers. The track also includes elements of R&B and pop musical genres, and, according to music critics, contains a gospel production and "crashing drums".

== Release and promotion ==
On 29 January 2008, Lewis announced on her website that "Footprints in the Sand", along with "Better in Time", would be released as a double A-side. The single was launched with the song "You Bring Me Down" as the B-side, and was released in the United Kingdom as a digital download on 9 March 2008, and a physical release on the following day, with proceeds going to the charity. The song was remixed for the single release ("Single Mix"), which, unlike the original version, begins with Lewis's voice only, and music starts after she performs the first verse—the album version of "Footprints in the Sand" starts with a piano tune before she starts to sing the lyrics—, and lasts at 3:58.

"Footprints in the Sand" became the official song of the charity Sport Relief, a biennial charity organised by Comic Relief and BBC Sport, for their 2008 broadcast. Lewis performed the song at the Sport Relief event. It included musicians on violas, violins, and piano, with The Tuff Session Singers providing the chorus. Images of "sadness and desperation" were projected during her performance, changing to "happiness" when The Tuff Session Singers began the third chorus. As part of promotion, Lewis performed the song live on the British television programme Dancing on Ice on 9 March 2008. Lewis has added the song to the setlist of her Glassheart Tour (2013) and I Am Tour (2016).

=== Music video ===
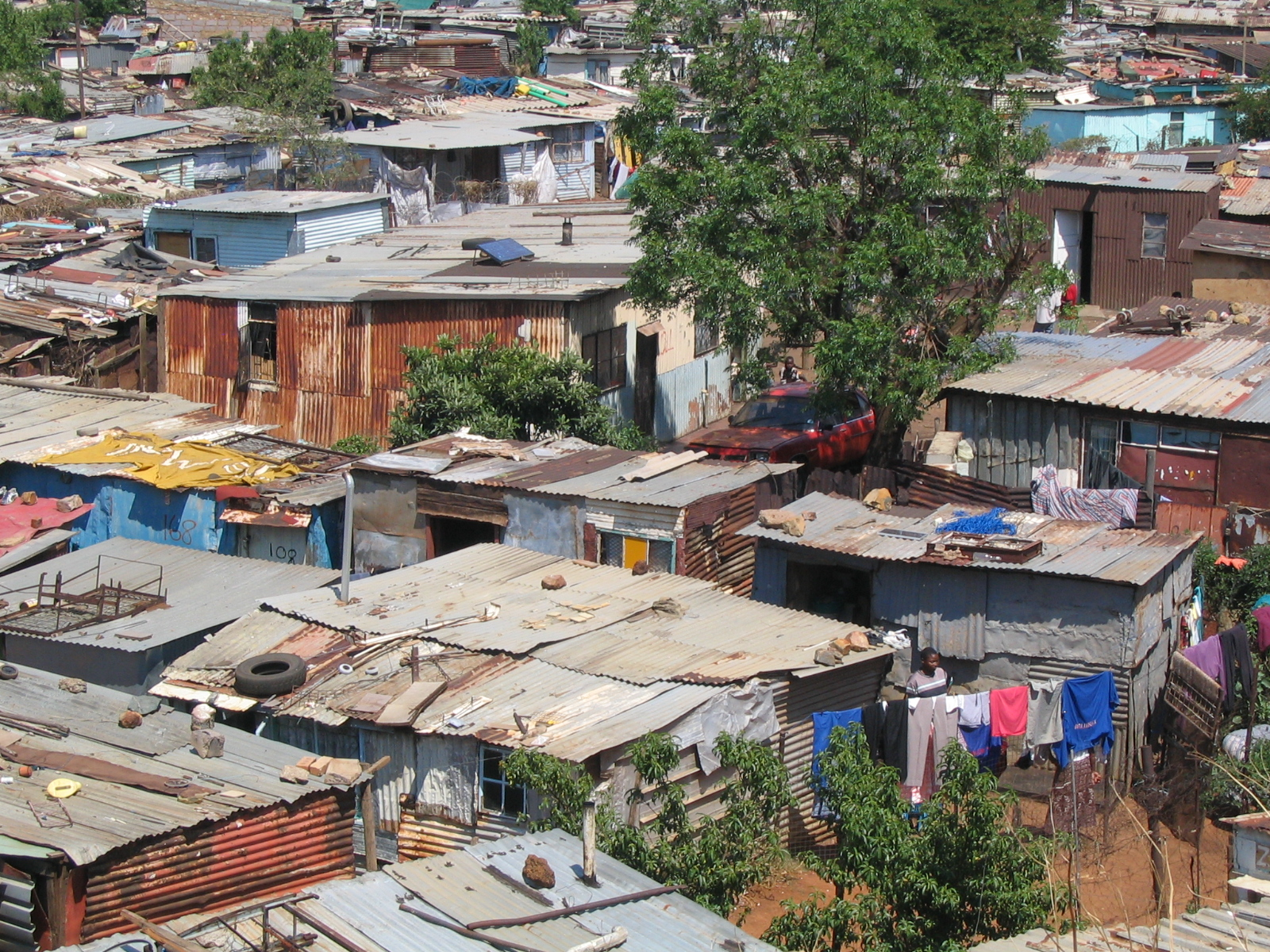
The music video was filmed in Johannesburg, South Africa. In it, images of poverty of the city (an urban area pictured) are shown.

The accompanying music video was filmed in Johannesburg, South Africa, and was directed by British director Sophie Muller back-to-back with the video for "Better in Time". It premiered on Lewis's official website and BBC Radio 1's website on 27 February 2008. The video begins with the message "Working to change lives across the world, in support of Sport Relief". Then, it intercuts a performance of Lewis in front of a wall and greyscale scenes: an image of a child walking on a landfill site, a funeral, a child lying in the street, and a kid sat in a traffic island. As the first chorus begins, the video continues showing scenes of poverty and AIDS issues in the country. Whilst the second verse goes, pictures of malnourished people appear. As the second chorus and the bridge elapse people crying still coming on the scene. But whereas The Tuff Session Singers start to sing the third chorus, the video begins to show images of kids playing association football and cricket. The video ends with children and people smiling as Lewis sings the outro of the song. It was released on the US iTunes Store on 3 February 2009.

== Reception ==
=== Critical response ===
Upon the release of Spirit, "Footprints in the Sand" received generally positive reviews by music critics, with some of them comparing Lewis's performance to other singers such as Mariah Carey and Christina Aguilera. In his review of the album, Chris Elwell-Sutton of the Evening Standard commented that the song would be perfect as a "theme to a Disney movie". Whilst reviewing Spirit, Chad Grischow of IGN Music described "Footprints in the Sand", along with "Here I Am", as a "sleeper ballad". Lyndsey Winship, a reviewer from BBC Music, noted that the song "is a piano warbler that brings Leona's voice to the forefront".

A reviewer for South African news site iafrica.com described the song as a "show-stopping [...] lush Mariah-style ballad [...] that utilises Lewis'[s] full vocal range and sounds uncannily like Carey at her best. Sal Cinquemani of Slant Magazine called it "drippy", and added that with "Footprints" Lewis would receive comparisons to Carey. Digital Spy's reviewers gave similar opinions about "Footprints in the Sand". Nick Levine in his review of the album called the song an "histrionic finale" of Spirit, and added that it "seems hellbent on revisiting Mariah Carey's schlock-pop masterwork 'Anytime You Need a Friend'". After it was released as a single Alex Fletcher claimed it has "the sort of ludicrous outro even Mariah Carey might consider over-the-top" and that its lyrics "will have your granny in tears". Sarah Walters from Manchester Evening News highlighted the song as appropriate for the Sport Relief, describing it as a "dreamy affair anchored by a big, shouty chorus".

=== Chart performance ===
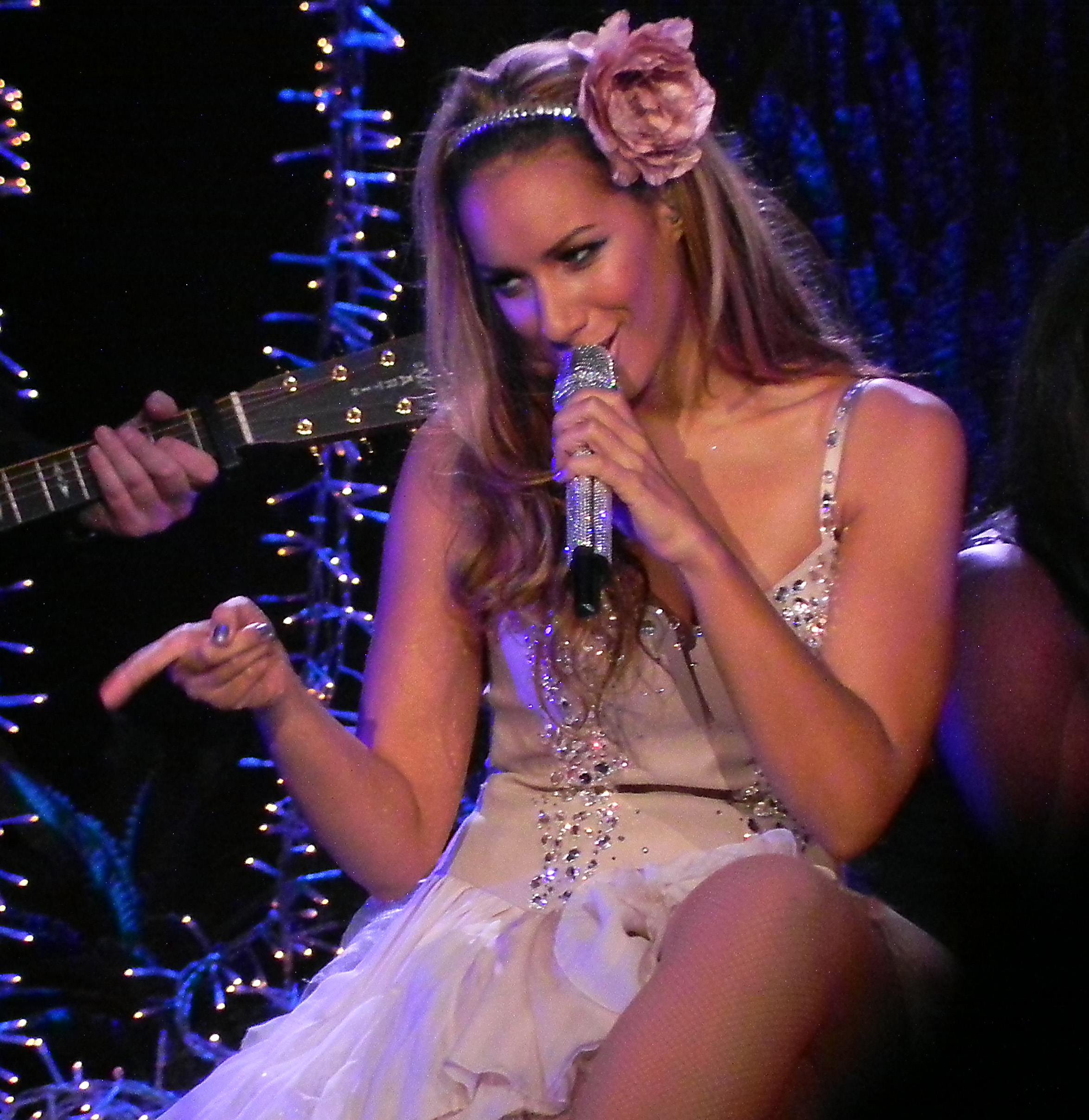
With the double A-side "Better in Time"/"Footprints in the Sand", Lewis gained her third consecutive top-five single in the UK.

"Footprints in the Sand" charted in Europe, reaching position seventy-three on the European Hot 100 Singles. In November 2007, the song debuted on the UK Singles Chart at number sixty-five, leaving the chart the next week. On 15 March 2008, the single re-entered it at number sixty-three. "Footprints in the Sand" claimed its peak position next week at number twenty-five, staying on the chart for eleven weeks. On the Irish Singles Chart the song debuted and peaked at number fifty; whilst on the Swiss Singles Chart, it debuted on 15 November 2009 at thirty-five, and it stayed there three weeks.

The double A-side "Better in Time"/"Footprints in the Sand" debuted at number seventy-four on the UK Singles Chart on 23 February 2008. After selling 40,476 copies it peaked at number two on 22 March 2008, the same week the individual release of "Footprints in the Sand" debuted in the top forty, after selling 7,525 copies. It became Lewis's third single to reach the top five in the UK. It was certified as gold by the British Phonographic Industry (BPI) on 16 January 2009. The single debuted on the German Singles Chart on 16 June 2008 at number five, and reached its peak position, at number two, on 28 July 2008. It also peaked on the European Hot 100 at number eight.

Since their releases, "Better in Time"/"Footprints in the Sand" has received a platinum certification by the BPI, indicating 600,000 copies sold, whilst the individual single release has received a silver certification, denoting 200,000 copies sold.

== Covers and use in popular culture ==
Welsh singer Lucie Jones sang "Footprints in the Sand" on the British singing competition programme The X Factor. On 1 June 2013, Hungarian shadow theatre group Attraction used the song during their live semi-final performance on Britain's Got Talent. In 2015 wildlife expert Bindi Irwin danced a contemporary freestyle to the song in the finals of season 21 of Dancing with the Stars. In 2019, Voices of Service sang "Footprints in the Sand" during the season 14 finals of America's Got Talent.

== Track listings and formats ==
CD single (Syco), CD single (RCA) and Swiss CD single

1. "Better in Time" (Single Mix) – 3:55
2. "Footprints in the Sand" (Single Mix) – 3:58

German premium single

1. "Better in Time" (Single Mix) – 3:55
2. "Footprints in the Sand" (Single Mix) – 3:58
3. "Bleeding Love" (Moto Blanco Remix Radio Edit) – 3:40
4. "Better in Time" (Video) – 3:58

Sony single; Swiss maxi single

1. "Better in Time" (Single Mix) – 3:55
2. "Footprints in the Sand" (Single Mix) – 3:58
3. "Bleeding Love" (Moto Blanco Remix Radio Edit) – 3:40

UK Sport Relief CD single

1. "Better in Time" – 3:55
2. "Footprints in the Sand" – 4:09
3. "You Bring Me Down" – 3:54

== Credits and personnel ==
"Footprints in the Sand"

- Leona Lewis – vocals
- Carmen Reese – background vocals
- The Tuff Session Singers – choirs
- Steve Mac – arranger, producer, keyboards and synthesizers
- Steve Pearce – bass
- Dave Arch – piano, organ, strings arranger
- John Paricelli – guitars
- Chris Laws – recorder, drums, pro–tools editor
- Daniel Pursey – recorder
- Hayden Bendall – strings recorder
- Richard Page – writer
- Per Magnusson – writer
- David Kreuger – writer
- Simon Cowell – writer

"You Bring Me Down"

- Leona Lewis – vocals, writer
- Salaam Remi – bass, piano, drums, writer
- Vincent Henry – saxophone, flute, clarinet
- Bruce Purse – trumpet, bass trumpet, flugelhorn
- Vlado Meller – master
- Manny Marroquin – mixer
- Taj Jackson – vocal producer, writer
- Gleyder "Gee" Disla – recorder
- Franklin "Esoses" Socorro – recorder

== Charts ==
=== Weekly charts ===
Chart (2007–2009)	Peak position
European Hot 100 Singles (Billboard)	73
European Hot 100 Singles (Billboard) with "Better in Time"	8
Germany (Official German Charts) with "Better in Time"	2
Ireland (IRMA)	50
Scottish Singles Sales (Official Charts) with "Better in Time"	1
Switzerland (Schweizer Hitparade)	35
UK Singles (Official Charts)	25
UK Singles (Official Charts) with "Better in Time"	2
UK Airplay (Music Week)	2

=== Year-end charts ===
Chart (2008)	Position
UK Singles (OCC) with "Better in Time"	37

== Certifications ==
Region	Certification	Certified units/sales
United Kingdom (BPI)	Silver	200,000^{‡}
United Kingdom (BPI) with "Better in Time"	Platinum	600,000^{‡}
^{‡} Sales+streaming figures based on certification alone.

== Release history ==
Release dates and formats for "Footprints in the Sand"
Region	Date	Format(s)	Label(s)	Ref.
United Kingdom	9 March 2008	Digital download (EP)	Syco	
United Kingdom	10 March 2008	Maxi CD	Syco	
Australia	19 April 2008	CD	Sony BMG	
Germany	9 May 2008	Digital download	Ariola	
Switzerland	16 May 2008	Maxi CD	Sony BMG	
Switzerland	23 May 2008	CD	Sony BMG	
Germany	30 May 2008	CD; maxi CD	Ariola	
Australia	5 July 2008	Digital download (EP); maxi CD	Sony BMG	
