= The Labyrinth (tour) =

2010 concert tour by Leona Lewis

- Tour by Leona Lewis
- Associated album: Spirit; Echo
- Start date: 28 May 2010
- End date: 6 July 2010
- Legs: 1
- No. of shows: 20 in Europe

Leona Lewis concert chronology
- The Labyrinth (2010); Glassheart Tour (2013)

The Labyrinth was the debut concert tour by British pop singer Leona Lewis. Beginning on 28 May 2010, it showcased songs from her debut album, Spirit (2007), and her second album, Echo (2009). Dates in the United Kingdom and the Republic of Ireland were completed with Australian singer Gabriella Cilmi serving as the support act for the majority of dates.

== Background ==
The tour was announced on 12 November 2009, with the confirmation of dates in Ireland and United Kingdom. Lewis' record label apparently said that money was no object. Fashion designer Antonio Berardi designed Lewis's specially commissioned ethical wardrobe for the tour, costing £175,000. Gabriella Cilmi supported Lewis on the majority of the tour, with Hermione Hennesy supporting Lewis's Belfast dates and Alex Gardner supporting Lewis in Birmingham on 10 June.

On 29 April 2010, it was announced on Lewis's official website that the tour would be called The Labyrinth. Speaking of the choice of title she said "I'm a big David Bowie fan and I loved the movie The Labyrinth growing up, it really has inspired me so much. I feel it kind of represents my life in a surreal way too, trying to find my way through a maze!" She then said of the show "I had such a fun night at my recent show at the Hackney Empire and it's given me a real taste for it. Over the last few years I've had some amazing experiences and sung in some really interesting places but it's going to be great to be able to perform all my own material on my very own tour. It's a dream come true."

On 10 May 2010 a North American leg was announced in the form of 20 shared dates on Christina Aguilera's Bionic Tour. However, on 25 May 2010, it was announced that Aguilera's tour had been delayed till 2011 due to the singer's film and album schedulings. It was since reported that Lewis's record label boss Simon Cowell was hoping to secure Lewis as special guest act for another artist in North America.

== Set list ==
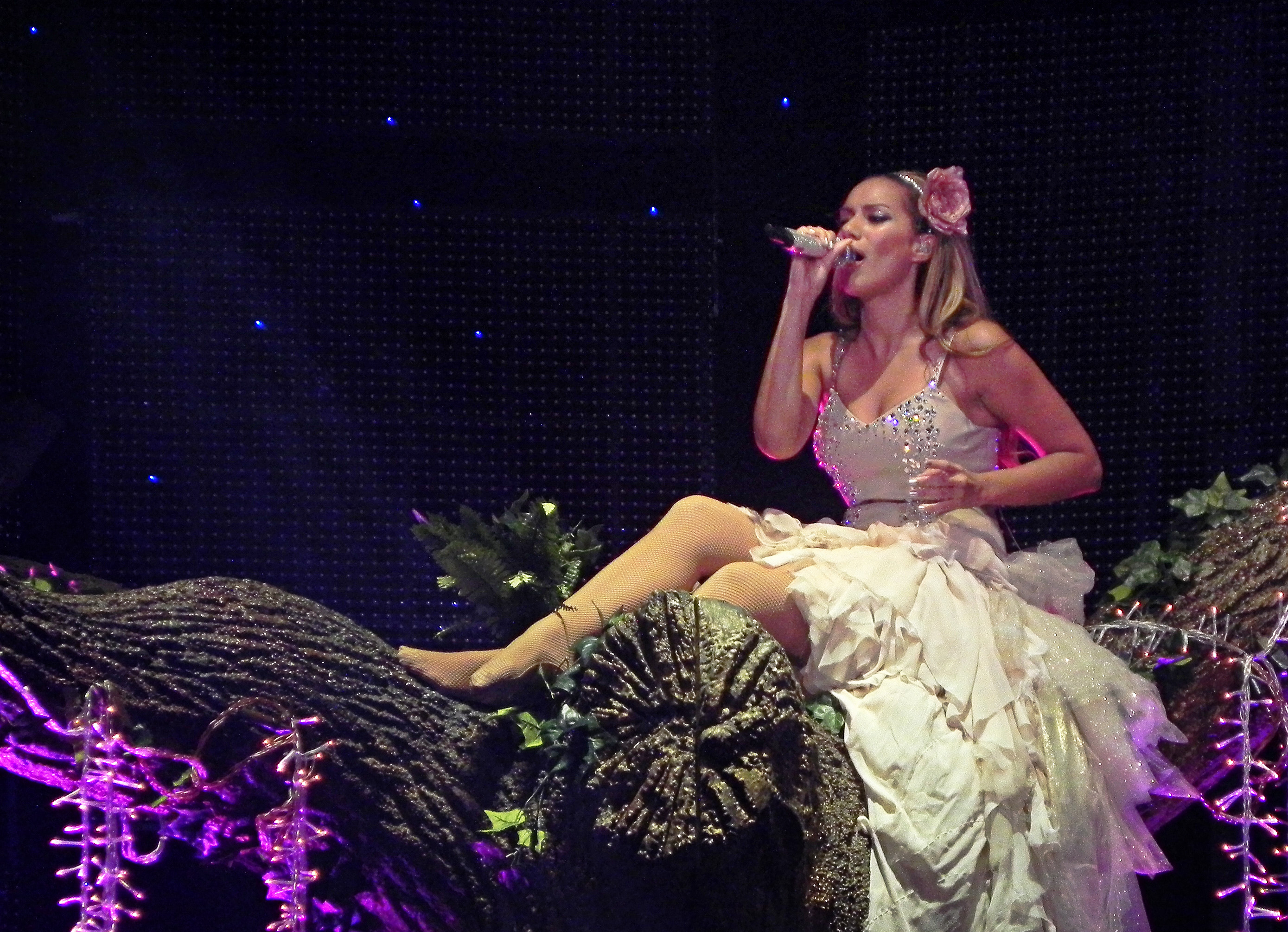
Leona Lewis performing at her show in 2010

1. "Intro"&"Brave"
2. "Don't Let Me Down"
3. "Better in Time"
4. "Whatever It Takes"
5. "Take a Bow"
6. Video interlude: "Ride a White Swan" (T. Rex cover)
7. "I See You"
8. "Can't Breathe"
9. "Forgive Me"
10. "Happy"
11. "Could It Be Magic" (Barry Manilow cover)
12. "I Got You"
13. "Cry Me a River" (Justin Timberlake cover)
14. "The First Time Ever I Saw Your Face"
15. "Homeless"
16. Video interlude: "They Don't Care About Us" (Michael Jackson cover) .
17. "Outta My Head"
18. "Sweet Dreams (Are Made of This)" (Eurythmics cover)
19. "Run"

Encore

20. "Bleeding Love"

Source: Teen Today

Additional notes

- On 16 June, actor Matthew Morrison from the television series Glee joined Lewis on stage at London's O2 Arena for a one-off performance of "Over the Rainbow"

== Opening acts ==
- Gabriella Cilmi (United Kingdom excluding Birmingham, 10 June and all Dublin and Belfast dates)
- Alex Gardner (Birmingham, 10 June)
- Hermione Hennesy (all Dublin and Belfast dates)

== Shows ==
List of concerts, showing date, city, constituent country, venue, opening act, tickets sold, number of available tickets and amount of gross revenue
Date	City	Constituent country	Venue	Opening act	Attendance	Revenue
28 May 2010	Sheffield	England	Sheffield Arena	Gabriella Cilmi	—	—
31 May 2010	Liverpool	England	Echo Arena	Gabriella Cilmi	—	—
2 June 2010	Nottingham	England	Trent FM Arena	Gabriella Cilmi	—	—
4 June 2010	Manchester	England	Manchester Evening News Arena	Gabriella Cilmi	24,156/ 25,360 (95%)	$1,448,460
6 June 2010	Manchester	England	Manchester Evening News Arena	Gabriella Cilmi	24,156/ 25,360 (95%)	$1,448,460
8 June 2010	Birmingham	England	LG Arena	Gabriella Cilmi	—	—
10 June 2010	Birmingham	England	LG Arena	Alex Gardner	—	—
12 June 2010	London	England	The O_{2} Arena	Gabriella Cilmi	53,919/ 60,800 (89%)	$3,229,460
14 June 2010	London	England	The O_{2} Arena	Gabriella Cilmi	53,919/ 60,800 (89%)	$3,229,460
16 June 2010	London	England	The O_{2} Arena	Gabriella Cilmi	53,919/ 60,800 (89%)	$3,229,460
18 June 2010	London	England	The O_{2} Arena	Gabriella Cilmi	53,919/ 60,800 (89%)	$3,229,460
20 June 2010	Glasgow	Scotland	Scottish Exhibition and Conference Centre	Gabriella Cilmi	—	—
22 June 2010	Glasgow	Scotland	Scottish Exhibition and Conference Centre	Gabriella Cilmi	—	—
24 June 2010	Newcastle	England	Metro Radio Arena	Gabriella Cilmi	—	—
27 June 2010	Dublin	Republic of Ireland	The O_{2}	Hermione Hennesy	15,574/ 15,574 (100%)	$918,057
29 June 2010	Dublin	Republic of Ireland	The O_{2}	Hermione Hennesy	15,574/ 15,574 (100%)	$918,057
1 July 2010	Belfast	Northern Ireland	Odyssey Arena	Hermione Hennesy	—	—
3 July 2010	Belfast	Northern Ireland	Odyssey Arena	Hermione Hennesy	—	—
5 July 2010	Cardiff	Wales	Cardiff International Arena	Gabriella Cilmi	—	—
6 July 2010	Cardiff	Wales	Cardiff International Arena	Gabriella Cilmi	—	—

== Box office data ==
According to Lewis's tour promoters (SJM Concerts, CAA and Modest! Management), dates in Liverpool, Manchester, Birmingham, the first three London Shows and Glasgow were sold out.

=== Box office score data ===
Venue	City	Tickets sold / available	Gross revenue
Manchester Evening News Arena	Manchester	24,156/ 25,360 (95%)	$1,448,460
O2 Arena	London	53,919/ 60,800 (89%)	$3,229,460
The O2	Dublin	15,574/ 15,574 (100%)	$918,057
	TOTAL	93,649 / 101,734 (92%)	$5,595,977

== Reception ==
Following the first concert in Sheffield, Sarah Crabtree from the Sheffield Star said: "Amidst a fairytale forest stage-set inspired by her favourite film The Labyrinth, she showcased the awesome talent that propelled her to stardom four years ago, and even pulled off some nifty dancing. Her incredible voice – when given free rein centre stage, pared back and powerful, emotive, sometimes haunting – was breathtaking. Sheffield was the first night of 18 dates on her first ever arena tour and it would be understandable if the debutante was nervous as she appeared, looking every inch the British Beyonce, in a tight black dress, over-the-knee boots and hooded cloak, beneath a gothic ruin swirling in mist. [...] One of Leona's great vocal strengths has always been her ability to convey powerful emotion, and she was at her brilliant best when the songs allowed her to do just that – to really sing, to deliver the lyrics clearly without too much backing, and to do so without distraction. She covered Justin Timberlake's "Cry Me a River" beautifully, sitting quietly, almost a capella. And a funked-up, clubby segment including stonking dance track "Outta My Head", a cover of "Sweet Dreams" by the Eurythmics, and a nod to Michael Jackson finally got the crowd on its feet and proved Leona's more than just a ballad singer. [...] And before belting out "Bleeding Love" she told her fans: "This is my first tour and my first night and I'm so glad I got to share it with you. This is a dream for me."

Pete Paphides from The Times gave the tour three out of five stars, saying: "With a live show apparently inspired by the Jim Henson fantasy flick Labyrinth, to the slow beats of "Brave", Lewis wandered through a bevy of semi-naked men in horned helmets — her black veil and slightly troubled gaze calling to mind an outrageously lavish Scottish Widows commercial. [...] A sense of the truly unexpected probably wasn't what Lewis's fans had turned up for, less still the sexually charged theatricality that comes as standard at, say, a Rihanna or Lady Gaga show. [...] A fairytale woodland scene festooned with lights served as the backdrop for a moderately pretty acoustic version of Justin Timberlake's "Cry Me a River". By this stage, one might have been forgiven for setting aside any idle hopes that Lewis might throw efficiency to the wind and truly lose herself in what she was singing. [...] She sang her biggest hit "Bleeding Love" in an outfit that seemed to have been inspired by Big Purple One from the Quality Street tin."

Bernadette McNulty from The Daily Telegraph gave the tour three out of five stars, saying "For her long-awaited debut tour, Leona Lewis was inspired by her favourite childhood film, Labyrinth. The 1986 fantasy adventure, starring David Bowie, provides rich pickings for the set designers, but it's the plotline that offers a glimpse into the mindset of the 2006 X-Factor winner – the teenage heroine escapes from a puppet-infested maze by declaring to her captor: "My will is as strong as yours, and my kingdom is as great ... you have no power over me!" [...] Her vocals were near inaudible on anything below her top range, yet the audience's proprietorial [sic] affections meant that they applauded her efforts but stayed glued to their seats. The inertia really set in when the middle section of ballads gassed the arena like a dry-ice cloud of emotion. Dressed as a fairy-tale princess, her childlike innocence was affecting, and she can certainly convey a trembling, pining heart. [...] Just when it felt like we were permanently trapped in a maze of polished but stilted performances, a trapdoor opened, strobes flashed and Lewis emerged in strikingly symbolic high-waisted leggings. The effect was startling: she seized control of the music and the audience, ordering them to their feet as she imperiously motored through her final hits. This tantalising glimpse of Lewis's hidden power suggests that if she wants her to career to really have legs she should wear the trousers more often.

== Credits and personnel ==
Taken and adapted from The Labyrinth Official Tour Programme.

Performers

- Lead vocals – Leona Lewis
- Support act – Gabriella Cilmi

Management

- Management (Modest!) – Nicola Carson, Richard Griffiths, Harry Magee
- Director – William Baker
- Assistant show director – Emma Bull
- Tour manager – Steve Martin
- Production – Steve Levit (Production North)
- Agent – David Zedeck (CAA)

Music

- Musical director – Paul Beard
- Guitar – Graham Kearns, Luke Potashnick
- Bass – Chris Brown
- Drums – Carlos Hurcules
- Background vocals – Adetoun Anibi, Zalika King

Choreography

- Choreographer – Jermaine Browne
- Assistant choreographer – Rachel Kay
- Dance captain – Jerry Reeve
- Dancers – Dennish Jauch, Jamie Karitzis, Jay Revell, Manew Sauls-Addison,
  Kate Collins, Briony Albert

Aerial Performers

- Aerial artistic director & choreographer – Dreya Webber
- Aerialists – Alexandra Apjarova, Shannon Beach, Sal Vallasso, Davide Zongoli

Stage and Costumes

- Stage set designer – Alan Macdonald
- Prop designer – Nicoline Refsing
- Lighting designers – Nick Whitehouse, Baz Halpin
- Lighting director – Graham Feast
- Head of security – Paul Higgins
- Hair stylist – Ben Cooke
- Make up – Jane Bradley
- Leona's head stylist – Allison Edmond
- Head stylist and costume designer – Stevie Stewart
- Stylists' assistant – Kate Jinkerson
- Leona's costume maker – Marco Morante
- Tour assistant – Alice Martin
