= I Got You (Leona Lewis song) =

Single by Leona Lewis

from the album Echo
- B-side: "Heartbeat"
- Released: 1 November 2009
- Studio: Westlake (Los Angeles); The Vault (Stockholm)
- Genre: Pop; R&B
- Length: 3:46
- Label: Syco; J
- Songwriters: Arnthor Birgisson; Max Martin; Savan Kotecha
- Producer: Arnthor Birgisson

Leona Lewis singles chronology
"Happy" (2009)	"I Got You" (2009)	"Collide" (2011)

Music video
- "Leona Lewis - I Got You (Official Video)" on YouTube

"I Got You" is a song recorded by British singer Leona Lewis for her second studio album Echo (2009). It was written by Arnthor Birgisson, Max Martin and Savan Kotecha, with production helmed by Birgisson. The song is a pop and R&B ballad, whose instrumentation consists of guitars and synthesizers. It was released as the second and final single from Echo on 1 November 2009, by Syco Music and J Records.

"I Got You" garnered mixed reviews from music critics; some praised Lewis' vocal performance and likened it to the structure of her cover of Snow Patrol's "Run", while others criticized it for not being memorable. A moderate commercial success, it peaked at number 14 on the UK Singles Chart, peaking within the top 40 in Austria, New Zealand, Slovakia and South Korea.

An accompanying music video for "I Got You" was filmed at Venice Beach in Los Angeles and directed by Dave Meyers. The video revolves around couples who try to resolve their differences and arguments. In the video, scenes of Lewis performing in front of a heart engulfed in flames and sitting on an apartment floor barefoot are intercut.

In the United States, Lewis performed the song live on the Late Show with David Letterman, whilst in the United Kingdom, she performed on multiple television shows, including So You Think You Can Dance, The Alan Titchmarsh Show and The National Lottery Draws. It was included on the set list of her debut tour The Labyrinth (2010).

== Recording, production and release ==
"I Got You" was written by Arnthor Birgisson, Max Martin and Savan Kotecha for Lewis' second studio album, Echo (2009). Production of the song was helmed by Birgisson. It was recorded by Birgisson at Westlake Recording Studios, Los Angeles, California and The Vault, Stockholm, Sweden. Birgisson and Lewis both handled the vocal production. It was mixed by Phil Tan at Soapbox Studios in Atlanta, Georgia, and Damien Lewis served as the assistant engineer. Background vocals were sung by Vicky Sandström and guitar was provided by Esbjörn Öhrwall. "Heartbeat" was co-written by Lewis, Birgisson and Ina Wroldsen, with production of the song once again helmed by Birgisson. It was recorded by Chris Kasych at Chalice Studios, Los Angeles, California, and The Vault in Stockholm, Sweden. It was mixed by Manny Marroquin, Christian Plata and Erik Madrid at Larrabee Studios, Universal City, California. Strings were provided by Janson & Janson and the Czech National Symphony Orchestra, which were recorded by Marcus Bergqvist. Guitar was provided by Esbjörn Öhrwall.

In the United States, "I Got You" was released to contemporary hit radio on 8 December 2009. In Europe, "I Got You" was released as an A-side and B-side, with "I Got You" as the A-side single, and "Heartbeat", a song which does not appear on any edition of Echo, as the B-side. It was released in Belgium, France, Italy, Germany, The Netherlands, Spain, and the United Kingdom, for digital download on 19 February 2010.

== Composition ==
"I Got You"
A 29-second sample of "I Got You"'s chorus, which features guitars and synthesisers

"I Got You" is a pop and R&B ballad, which lasts for a duration of 3 minutes, 49 seconds. The song was composed in the key of G major using common time with a tempo at 104 beats per minute. Lewis' vocal range spans over two octaves, from the low note of G_{3} to the high note of A_{5}, on the song. It incorporates elements of adult contemporary music and contemporary R&B genres. Instrumentation consists of guitars and synthesizers. Fraser McAlpine for the BBC compared "I Got You"'s structure to her cover of Snow Patrol's "Run". McAlpine noted that it follows the same four chord progression as "Run", and also is instrumentally complete with guitars. He also noted that Lewis performs the verses of "I Got You" quietly, and belts the chorus, like on "Run".

== Critical reception ==
"I Got You" garnered mixed reviews from music critics. Peter Robinson for The Guardian wrote that "I Got You" "is an impressive distant relative of Bleeding Love". Leah Greenblatt for Entertainment Weekly praised "I Got You", along with "Happy", as they allowed Echo to redeem itself from the "soppy balladry and standard-issue dancery" present on the rest of the album. Greenblatt's only criticism was that "it can be difficult to connect with the woman who wields it." Mayer Nissim for Digital Spy awarded the song three stars out of a possible five; Nissim was complimentary of Lewis' vocal performance, which he described as "effortless" in the verses and that she belts out the chorus with "gusto." However, Nissim was critical of the song's production, writing that although Lewis sings with conviction, it is not as memorable as other ballads. He continued to write that her voice will allow the song to chart fairly well, and that she should collaborate with other producers to make more memorable songs. Fraser McAline for the BBC awarded the song three stars out of a possible five; McAlpine noted that although Lewis is able to provide "some kind of musical movement, by wandering off the path set down by the song," he was critical of the song's structure, and labeled it "lazy."

== Chart performance ==
"I Got You" was a moderate commercial success, and managed to peak inside the top 50 singles charts in most regions. In the United Kingdom, the song debuted at number 127 on the UK Singles Chart on 6 February 2010, two weeks before its release as single. It debuted inside the official top 40 at number 40 on 27 February 2010, and leaped to its peak position of number 14 the following week. It managed to attain more success on the UK R&B Chart; it debuted inside to top 40 R&B singles at number 40 on 6 February 2010, and reached its peak of number three on 6 March 2010. In Ireland, "I Got You" debuted at number 47 on 25 February 2010, and reached a peak of number 43 the following week. Elsewhere, "I Got You" peaked at number 30 in Austria, number 20 in the Flanders region of Belgium, number 13 on the singles chart and number 30 on the airplay chart in the Wallonia region of Belgium, number 43 in Germany, number 29 in New Zealand, and number 57 in Switzerland. In South Korea, "I Got You" peaked at number 15 on the international chart, placing at number 138 on the 2010 year-end Download chart, with 92,744 units sold.

== Music video ==
The song's accompanying music video was directed by Dave Meyers, and shot at Venice Beach, California on 21 December 2009. The content of the video revolves around "several couples as they deal with the ups and downs of relationships." Prior to the release of the video, Lewis tweeted "It's a strong, cool performance, lots of actors with a movie feel to it. I'm so proud of it and hope you love it – enjoy!" The video was released on 12 February 2010. In the video, scenes of Lewis performing in front of a heart engulfed in flames, as well as sitting on an apartment floor barefoot, are intercut throughout the video amongst the narrative of the video. The video shows several couples ending their relationships, showing many of them are who angry and cannot cope with the heartbreak, but progresses to show how they manage to rebuild their relationships with one another, ending with images suggesting healing, happiness and new relationships.

== Live performances ==
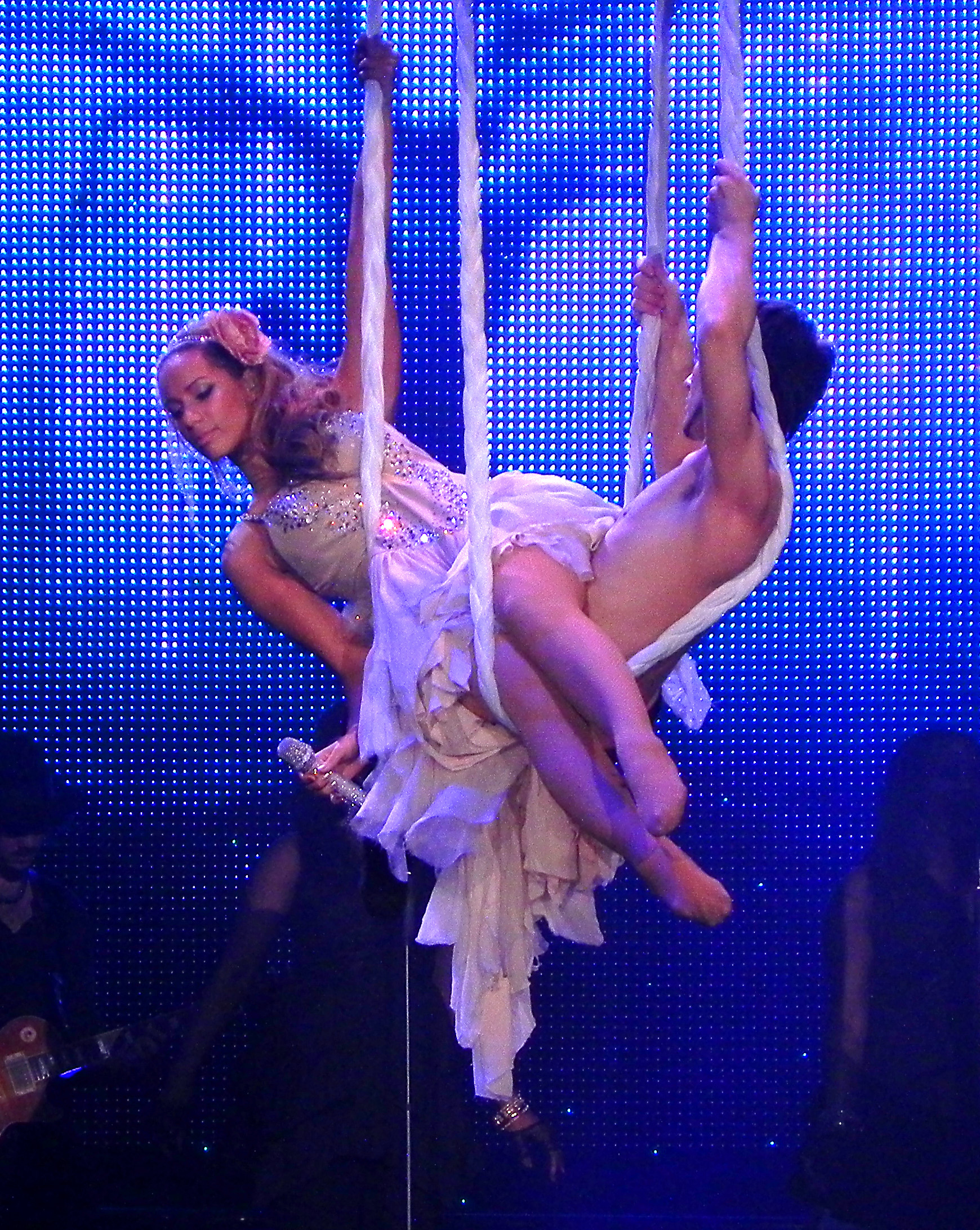
Lewis performing "I Got You" on The Labyrinth tour in 2010

Lewis performed "I Got You" for the first time at a one-off private concert at the Hackney Empire in London, United Kingdom, on 2 November 2009, which served as a taster show to Lewis' The Labyrinth (2010). On 2 December 2009, the singer performed the song on The National Lottery Draws. The following day on 3 December 2009, Lewis on the BBC Radio 2 show Live Sessions with Ken Bruce, as part of a set list which included "Bleeding Love", "Better in Time", "Happy" and her own cover of Oasis's "Stop Crying Your Heart Out". On 15 December 2009, to coincide with the song's radio release in the United States, Lewis performed the song on the Late Show with David Letterman. On 21 January 2010, Lewis appeared on BBC Radio 1's Live Lounge where she performed "I Got You" as well as covering Oasis' "Stop Crying Your Heart Out" for a second time, and also gave an interview as to why she decided to cover that song. On 6 February 2010, Lewis performed "I Got You" on the semi-final of So You Think You Can Dance on 6 February 2010. Lewis also performed the song to coincide with the official release in the UK on GMTV on 22 February 2010, Promotion of the song ended with a performance and interview The Alan Titchmarsh Show on 26 February 2010. In late May 2010, the song was included in the setlist for Lewis' first concert tour, The Labyrinth.

== Track listing ==
Digital Download
No.	Title	Writer(s)	Producer(s)	Length
1.	"I Got You"	Arnthor Birgisson; Savan Kotecha; Max Martin	Birgisson	3:46
2.	"Heartbeat"	Leona Lewis; Birgisson; Ina Wroldsen	Birgisson	3:51

== Credits and personnel ==
=== "I Got You" ===
Recording

- Recorded at Westlake Recording Studios, Los Angeles, CA; The Vault, Stockholm, Sweden.
- Mixed at Soapbox Studios, Atlanta, GA.

Personnel

- Production – Arnthor Birgisson
- Vocal recording – Arnthor Birgisson
- Vocal production – Arnthor Birgisson, Leona Lewis
- Mixing – Phil Tan
- Additional engineering – Damien Lewis
- Background vocals – Vicky Sandström
- Guitar – Esbjörn Öhrwall

=== "Heartbeat" ===
Recording

- Recorded at Chalice Studios, Los Angeles, CA; The Vault, Stockholm, Sweden.
- Mixed at Larrabee Studios, Universal City, CA.

Personnel

- Production – Arnthor Birgisson
- Vocal recording – Chris Kasych
- Mixing – Manny Marroquin, Christian Plata, Erik Madrid
- Strings – Janson & Janson, Czech National Symphony Orchestra
- String recording – Marcus Bergqvist
- Guitar – Esbjörn Öhrwall

"Heartbeat" credits adapted from "I Got You" CD single, and "I Got You" credits adapted from the liner notes of Echo, Syco Music, J Records, Sony Music.

== Charts ==
=== Weekly charts ===
Weekly chart performance for "I Got You"
Chart (2010)	Peak position
Austria (Ö3 Austria Top 40)	30
Belgium (Ultratip Bubbling Under Flanders)	20
Belgium (Ultratip Bubbling Under Wallonia)	13
Belgium Airplay (Ultratop 40 Wallonia)	30
Denmark Airplay (Tracklisten)	13
Germany (GfK)	43
Ireland (IRMA)	43
Japan Hot 100 (Billboard)	69
Netherlands (Dutch Top 40 Tipparade)	11
New Zealand (Recorded Music NZ)	29
Scottish Singles Sales (Official Charts)	14
Slovakia Airplay (ČNS IFPI)	27
South Korea International (Gaon)	15
Switzerland (Schweizer Hitparade)	57
UK Singles (OCC)	14
UK R&B (OCC)	3

=== Year-end charts ===
Year-end chart performance for "I Got You"
Chart (2010)	Position
South Korea International Download (Gaon)	138

== Certifications ==
Certifications for "I Got You"
Region	Certification	Certified units/sales
United Kingdom (BPI)	Silver	200,000^{‡}
^{‡} Sales+streaming figures based on certification alone.

== Release history ==
Release dates and formats for "I Got You"
Region	Date	Format(s)	Label(s)	Ref.
United Kingdom	1 November 2009	Digital download	Syco	
United States	8 December 2009	Contemporary hit radio	J	
United Kingdom	9 April 2010	CD	Syco	

== Notes ==
- Lewis, Leona (2009), Leona Lewis Echo, Wise publications, ISBN 978-1-84938-396-7
