= Forgive Me (Leona Lewis song) =

2008 single by Leona Lewis

Single by Leona Lewis

from the album Spirit
- B-side: "Myself"
- Released: 26 July 2008
- Recorded: 2008
- Studio: Doppler Studios (Atlanta, Georgia); Henson Recording Studios (Los Angeles, California)
- Genre: Pop
- Length: 3:39 (album version); 3:24 (radio edit)
- Label: Sony BMG; Syco; J
- Songwriters: Aliaune "Akon" Thiam; Claude Kelly; Giorgio Tuinfort
- Producer: Akon

Leona Lewis singles chronology
"Better in Time" / "Footprints in the Sand" (2008)	"Forgive Me" (2008)	"Run" (2008)

Music video
- "Forgive Me" on YouTube

"Forgive Me" is a song by British singer Leona Lewis, featured on the North American and Australian versions, as well as the deluxe edition, of her debut album Spirit (2008). Musically, it is a pop track with dance influences. The lyrics tell the story of a girl who has found a new love and asks her former partner for forgiveness. The song was written by Aliaune "Akon" Thiam, Claude Kelly and Giorgio Tuinfort, and produced by the former. "Forgive Me" was released as the album's fourth single in the United Kingdom on 3 November 2008. The single includes a B-side, "Myself", written by and featuring vocals of American musician Novel.

In "Forgive Me", music critics compared Lewis's vocals with those of Whitney Houston and Mariah Carey. The music video, directed by Wayne Isham, was inspired by multiple Broadway musicals, including Carousel and West Side Story. "Forgive Me" debuted at number five on both the British and Irish charts, becoming Lewis's fourth single to enter the UK top ten, and receiving a silver certification by the British Phonographic Industry. It also topped the Slovak Singles Chart and reached the top ten in Italy and Sweden.

Lewis promoted "Forgive Me" on some television programmes, such as GMTV and The National Lottery Live, in the UK, as well as Carràmba! Che sorpresa in Italy, and Idol on sweden. The song was also included in the setlists of her The Labyrinth (2010) and Glassheart (2013) tours.

== Background and composition ==
"Forgive Me"
A 20-second sample of "Forgive Me", a song described as a "funky pop song" that contrasts with her previous ballad singles.

"Forgive Me" was written by Claude Kelly, Giorgio Tuinfort and Aliaune "Akon" Thiam, with production handled by the latter. The single release included one B-side, "Myself", written by Justin E. Boykin, Graham N. Marsh, Lewis and Alonzo "Novel" Stevenson.

"Forgive Me" is described as a "funky pop song", written in A minor. According to the sheet music published by Sony BMG, it moves at 120 beats per minute and is set in common time. On it, Lewis performs her highest pitch (G_{5}) in falsetto during the final chorus, and her lowest pitch (A_{3}) during each verse.

"Forgive Me" describes a female protagonist in a one-sided relationship who leaves her boyfriend and eventually finds someone to reciprocate her love. Though she has found love from someone else, she defends herself and asks her ex-boyfriend for forgiveness. In an interview with Digital Spy, Lewis explained why she decided to change her musical genre from her previous singles to a more upbeat one. She said: "I wanted to do something a bit different and the chance to work with Akon came about. I'm really pleased with how it's turned out and it's great that it's different, rather than what I always do." There are two versions of the song, the "album version" (3:40) and the "single mix" (3:24).

== Release and promotion ==
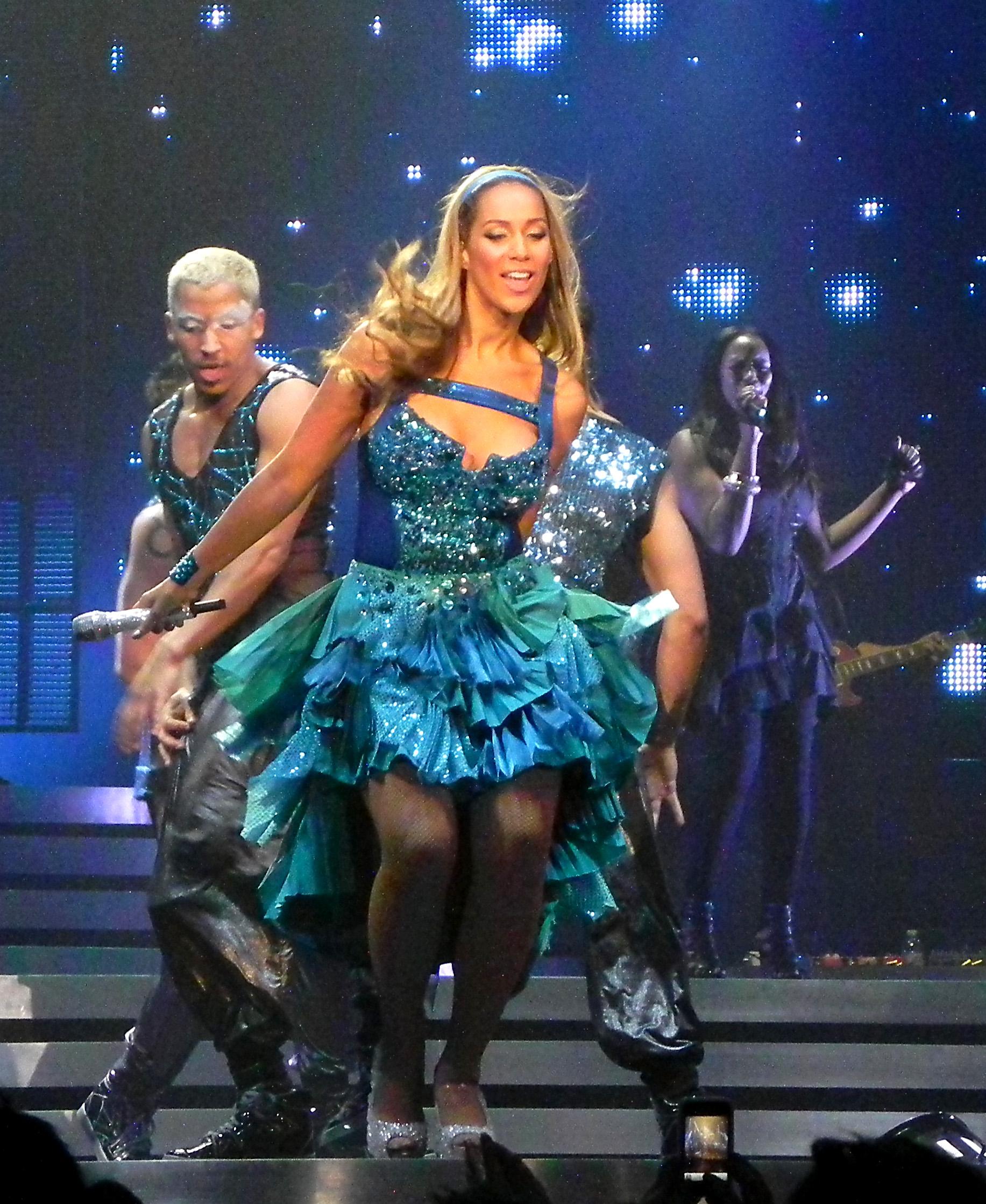
Lewis performing "Forgive Me" during the tour The Labyrinth

On 26 July 2008, the single mix was released to the Mexican iTunes Store as a stand-alone digital single. For the UK release, the single cover was revealed on 17 September 2008, whilst the song was released in the UK on 3 November 2008 as the fourth single. Originally, the song was featured only in the North American version of the album Spirit, launched in April 2008. Later, "Forgive Me" was included on the Australian reissue of Spirit, and also appeared on the deluxe edition of the album, which was released in November 2008.

Lewis performed the song on the television programmes The National Lottery Live on 29 October 2008, and GMTV on 31 October 2008. Outside of the UK, she also performed the song on the Italian television show Carràmba! Che sorpresa and on the Swedish talent show Idol. In May 2010, the song was added to the setlist of her tour The Labyrinth, performed as the eighth song of the show. A live performance from The O2 Arena was featured on the live album's DVD The Labyrinth Tour Live from The O2. In 2013, Lewis included "Forgive Me" to the setlist of her Glassheart Tour.

== Critical reception ==
"Forgive Me" received generally positive reviews from music critics. CBBC's Newsround described "Forgive Me" as a danceable song. Gavin Martin of The Mirror gave the song three-out-of-five points and said, "[the song] showcases her voice of fire and honey. No apologies necessary". Nick Levine, Digital Spy music critic, gave the song a similar score, and compared it with Whitney Houston's song "I'm Your Baby Tonight". Levine added that after her previous three ballad singles, "it's a nice change". However, he also said the lyrics were implausible as "the adultery-theme [is a] poor match for the sweet, unassuming Hackney girl".

Chad Grischow noted that with the song Lewis "will not go down as a glorified one-hit wonder". Stephen Thomas Erlewine described "Forgive Me" and another song from the album ("Misses Glass") as "just slightly glitzier than the rest of Spirit." Sal Cinquemani of Slant Magazine called the song "bouncy and youthful". Nate Chinen from The New York Times ironised with a "so what if she sounds like a second-tier Mariah".

Neil McCormick of The Daily Telegraph criticised Lewis's performance during The Labyrinth Tour, describing the dancing routing "as classy as something you'd see from local schoolgirls".

== Chart performance ==
"Forgive Me" debuted and peaked at number five in the United Kingdom on 15 November 2008, becoming Lewis's third single in debut within the top ten, after "A Moment Like This" and "Bleeding Love". In Ireland, before its official release as a single, it was the second highest debut of the week of the Irish Singles Chart, at number five.

In the Slovak Airplay Chart, it debuted at number seventy-six and in its tenth week the song peaked at number one. In the Euro Digital Tracks the song reached the number 4. In Italy, "Forgive Me" debuted at number nine, but fell off the chart next week. Elsewhere in Europe, the song reached number seven in Sweden, twelve in Switzerland, and fifteen in both Austria and Germany. The song entered the Australian charts at number fifty on 19 October 2008, and next week peaked at forty-nine. Later, "Forgive Me" dropped out of the chart, but on 10 November 2009, it re-entered at number fifty.

In the 2008 UK year-end chart, compiling the best-selling singles of the year, "Forgive Me" was eighty-fifth. It was certified as silver by the British Phonographic Industry (BPI) on 29 December 2023, denoting sales of 200,000 copies.

== Music video ==
Lewis performing in the Singin' in the Rain-inspired scene in the music video

The music video for "Forgive Me" was directed by Wayne Isham. It starts out with Lewis receiving a text message from her boyfriend informing he is just a minute away from meeting up with her. The video then turns into a dream-like sequence with Lewis dancing in four set-ups inspired by the Hollywood musicals West Side Story, The Rocky Horror Show, Singin' in the Rain and Carousel. The video ends with Lewis coming back to reality after a drop of rain lands on her hand as her boyfriend sends a message saying, "Hurry! Looks like there could be rain".

Mark Savage from BBC News commented that Lewis does not dance in the video. Lewis replied, "I love dancing [...] but I am a singer and that is what I do".

== Tracklisting and formats ==
German CD single / Switzerland CD maxi

1. "Forgive Me" (single mix) – 3:24
2. "Myself" feat. Novel – 3:50
3. "Forgive Me" (video)

UK CD single

1. "Forgive Me" (single mix) – 3:24
2. "Myself" feat. Novel – 3:50

== Credits and personnel ==
"Forgive Me"

- Serban Ghenea: mixer
- Mark Goodchild: recorder
- John Hanes: Pro Tools engineer
- Larry Jackson: vocal producers
- Claude Kelly: vocal producers, writer
- Leona Lewis: vocals, background vocals
- Trent Privat: recorder assistant
- Tim Roberts: Pro Tools engineer assistant
- Aliaune "Akon" Thiam: background vocals, producer, writer
- Giorgio Tuinfort: co-producer, writer

"Myself"

- Justin E. Boykin: acoustic guitar, writer
- James Burch: cello
- Matt Colette: drums, percussion
- Everett James Harrell: piano, bells
- Leona Lewis: vocals, background vocals, writer
- Carlton Lynn: mixer, recorder
- Graham Marsh: recorder, writer
- Kimberly L. Smith: project coordinator
- Alonzo "Novel" Stevenson: additional vocals, producer, writer

== Charts ==
=== Weekly charts ===
Chart (2008)	Peak position
Australia (ARIA)	49
Austria (Ö3 Austria Top 40)	15
Belgium (Ultratop 50 Flanders)	26
Belgium (Ultratip Bubbling Under Wallonia)	1
Bulgaria (BAMP)	2
CIS Airplay (TopHit)	108
Czech Republic (Rádio Top 100 Oficiální)	58
Denmark (Tracklisten)	14
Euro Digital Song Sales (Billboard)	4
Germany (GfK)	15
Hungary (Rádiós Top 40)	14
Ireland (IRMA)	5
Italy (FIMI)	9
Japan (Japan Hot 100)	39
Netherlands (Dutch Top 40 Tipparade)	6
Scottish Singles Sales (Official Charts)	2
Slovakia (Rádio Top 100 Oficiálna)	1
Sweden (Sverigetopplistan)	7
Switzerland (Schweizer Hitparade)	12
UK Singles (Official Charts)	5

=== Year-end charts ===
Chart (2008)	Position
Sweden (Sverigetopplistan)	95
UK Singles (OCC)	85

Chart (2009)	Position
Hungary (Rádiós Top 40)	79

== Certifications ==
Region	Certification	Certified units/sales
United Kingdom (BPI)	Silver	200,000^{‡}
^{‡} Sales+streaming figures based on certification alone.

== Release history ==
Release dates and formats for "Forgive Me"
Region	Date	Format(s)	Label(s)	Ref.
Mexico	26 July 2008	Digital download	Sony BMG	
Germany	31 October 2008	CD	Ariola	
Switzerland	31 October 2008	Maxi CD	Sony Music	
Australia	1 November 2008	CD	Sony Music	
United Kingdom	3 November 2008	CD; digital download	Syco	

== Bibliography ==
- Lewis, Leona (2008). Leona Lewis Spirit. Milwaukee, Wisconsin: EMI Music Publishing (exclusive distributor Hal Leonard). ISBN 978-1-4234-4568-5. OCLC 607167774.
