= Emma Bull (art director) =

British art director

- Born: Chester, England
- Education: Rose Bruford College
- Occupation(s): Artistic director, show director, creative consultant

Emma Bull is an English artistic director, show director and creative consultant. She has worked in the fields of film, television, theatre, music videos and concert touring.

== Early life and education ==
Bull was born in Chester, England. Most of her early life was spent in Hong Kong. She gained a place at Rose Bruford College in London, a theatre college that focuses on specific theatre disciplines. She earned a BA Hons Degree in Lighting Design.

== Career ==
=== Early TV and theatre work ===
After a brief stint in the Lighting Department for a selection of BBC TV productions, working alongside UK lighting directors Mark Kenyon, Will Charles and Roger Williams as well as working in the lighting departments of West End London theatres including Sadler's Wells and the Royal Opera House. She also undertook Wigmaking, Costume and Props roles in theatre and touring.

=== Film ===
Emma has been credited as a Costume Designer for the 2008 film "Trimming the Fat" as well as Costume Assistant on "Flashbacks of a Fool" starring Daniel Craig, and Art Department Assistant on "Ruby Blue" starring Bob Hoskins.

=== William Baker ===
A chance introduction to show director, photographer and stylist William Baker led to a friendship and work relationship that spanned 10 years. She worked as Baker's assistant, in his position as Kylie Minogue's Creative Director, on photoshoots, video shoots and tours. During 2006/7 she was Stylist and Head of Wardrobe for Minogue as well as Costume and Wig Supervisor on her "Homecoming" Tour, directed by Baker. Emma was commissioned to design and make a silver beaded headdress for the show finale costume, a collaboration with Matthew Williamson, Stephen Jones and Pucci. The headdress is now exhibited at the Victoria and Albert Museum in London. Baker employed her as Assistant Creative Director on Kylie Minogue's "X" Tour in 2007-8. She also worked alongside Baker creating tours for Il Divo and Westlife and assisted him in styling the Britney Spears' Circus tour.

=== Artistic Director ===
Emma directed her first international solo concert tour at the end of 2009 with 'Christmas with Il Divo' and has gone on to create many tours, including the Highly acclaimed "Farewell Tour' for Irish band Westlife. In early 2012, Emma undertook a special commission to create a show with Cirque du Soleil and LOCOG for the London 2012 Olympics 'The Art of Gymnastics.
