= Happy (Leona Lewis song) =

2009 single by Leona Lewis

Single by Leona Lewis

from the album Echo
- B-side: "Let It Rain"
- Released: 15 September 2009
- Recorded: 2009
- Studio: RAK (London, UK); Chalice (Los Angeles, California); Henson (Hollywood, California); Park Hill (Denver, Colorado)
- Genre: Pop; R&B
- Length: 4:01
- Label: Syco; J
- Songwriters: Leona Lewis; Evan Bogart; Ryan Tedder
- Producer: Tedder

Leona Lewis singles chronology
"I Will Be" (2009)	"Happy" (2009)	"I Got You" (2009)

Music video
- "Leona Lewis - Happy" on YouTube

"Happy" is a song performed by British singer Leona Lewis for her second studio album Echo (2009). It was written by Lewis, Ryan Tedder, Evan Bogart, and produced by Tedder, and it premiered on UK radio on 6 September 2009, and was officially released on 15 September 2009, by digital download in the U.S., serving as the album's lead single. Lyrically, it talks about a protagonist, that wants to be happy and seize the day.

It received generally positive reviews from music critics, praising the production and, some of them, calling it a "number one song". The single was promoted in the television programmes America's Got Talent, The X Factor, among others, and on the VH1 Divas concert in 2009. The music video was filmed in Cuba, and describes a woman who is in love with her friend. The song peaked at number 31 on the Billboard Hot 100 in the U.S., and debuted and peaked at number two in the UK, being blocked from the top spot by the song "Meet Me Halfway" by The Black Eyed Peas. Moreover, the single reached the top ten in Austria, Germany, Ireland, Japan and Switzerland.

== Background ==
"Happy" was written by Lewis, Ryan Tedder and Evan Bogart, and produced by Tedder for Lewis's second album Echo. The song, which is four minutes and two seconds in length, was recorded immediately after it was written. In a message on MySpace, Tedder wrote:

"I honestly feel it is the most beautiful song I've ever been a part of. My goal when I started working on Leona's new album was to '[not]' chase or be influenced by any of her previous hits—or any songs [I]'ve ever done with anyone else—including 'Bleeding Love'. True artists do not look back to previous successes; they look forward to creating new moments and songs the world can connect with in a different way. And that is what Leona has done with 'Happy'. I hope [you] like it as much as we do, and I hope the lyrics hit [you] as hard as they hit me".

Lewis discussed the inspiration for the song in an interview with Entertainment Weekly: "[W]e felt like happiness is something everyone strives to have, and sometimes it's not just about being happy, but if you have obstacles in your life that you have to get over to be happy. And it's just about that striving to get there. [I]t was kind of like looking back at all of the things I've been through, just kind of putting that into the song." The song was released with two B-sides: "Let It Rain" in Europe and Japan, and "Fly Here Now", only in Japan.

== Composition ==
"Happy"
A 28 second sample of the song's chorus, which features Lewis singing over a mid-tempo rhythm.

"Happy" is a pop and R&B ballad, song written in C major; Lewis' vocal range extends from G_{3} to C_{6}. It moves at 76 beats per minute and is set in common time. Lewis explained the lyrics and interpretation of "Happy" in an interview with the Associated Press, saying, "It's a contradiction of song because, yes, it's named 'Happy', but the song's kind of dark, a bit sad, sombre. In my songs, I want people to go on a journey, and [to get to] happiness, you go through a lot of pain and sadness to get there sometimes and that's what we wanted to convey on the song." Nick Levine, from Digital Spy, commented about the lyrics that the song talks about a protagonist, that, regardless of what happens, wants to be happy, while the message of the song is "seize the day".

== Critical reception ==
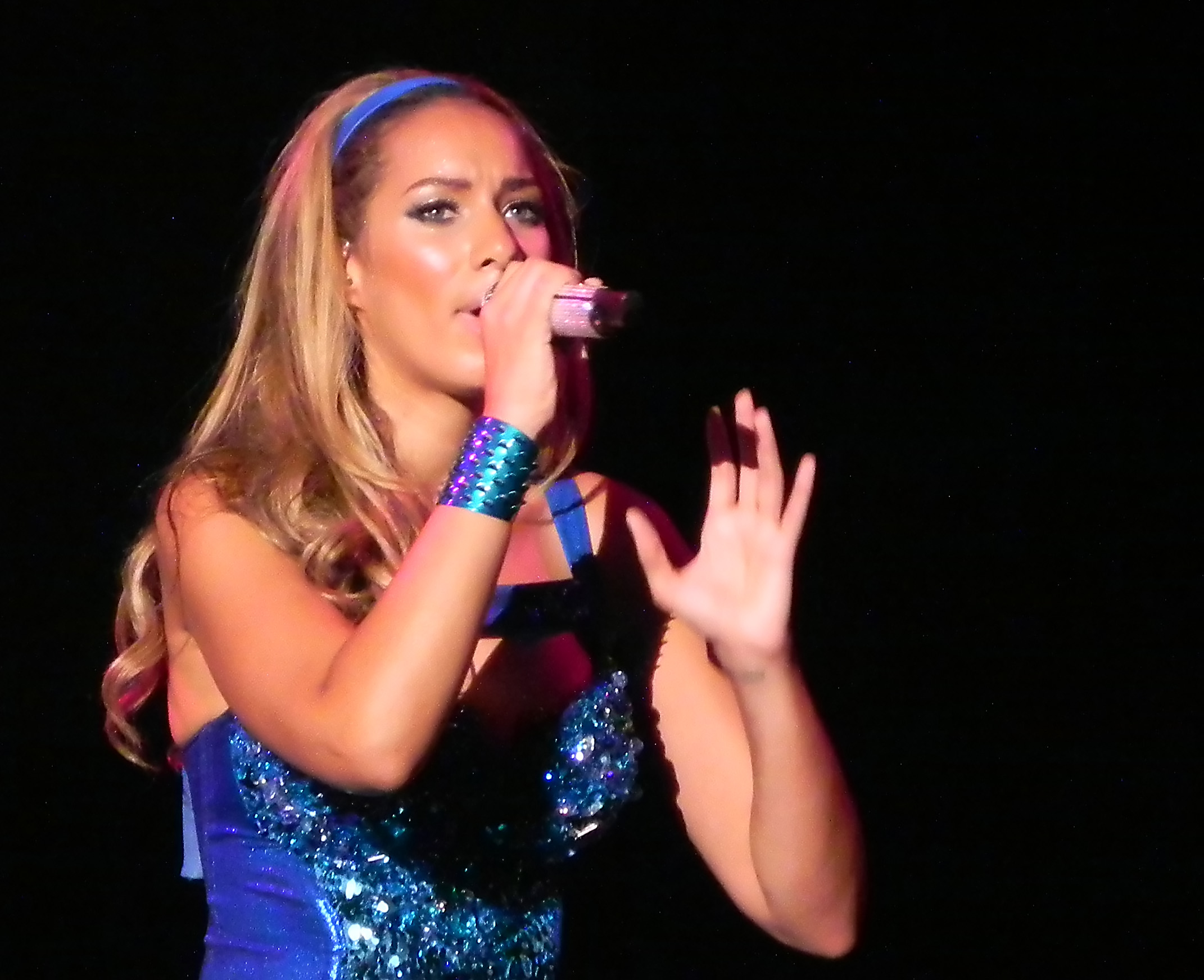
Lewis performing "Happy" on the tour The Labyrinth.

"Happy" received general acclaim from music critics. It has been described as "an amazing song" by Rick Krim, the executive producer of VH1 Divas, while a reviewer for music website Popjustice said, "In short: the Leona Lewis single is above average. A brilliant way to open the second album campaign and a proper world class piece of pop tuneage which doesn't have quite all the indecipherable mysterious magic of "Bleeding Love" but still boasts more than 97% of other pop tunes". Nick Levine of Digital Spy favoured the song, saying, "Leona delivers it beautifully. In fact, her vocal run from 2:39 to 2:44 could be the most incredible five seconds of singing we've heard all year. [...] It's a really strong lead single that sounds like a number one, and a typically muscular production from Tedder, but above all it's a powerful and moving song". Ryan Seacrest has stated on his American Top 40 radio show that it is "going to be a number one song".

Jennifer Adeeko from the organisation behind the MOBO Awards said, "Within the song Lewis is able to show how spectacular her vocal range is, with her softer sounding vocals to her more powerful, belting vocals. [...] Bound to get a few guys flustered if their girlfriends listen to the track and follow the lyrics; we predict that this is going to be one of her biggest track[s] to date". Entertainment Weekly critic Michael Slezak wrote that "while "Happy" is a solidly written, professionally produced song with a Velcro-ey hook, it has the emotional resonance of a so-so, big-budget romantic comedy. [...] In the hands of a singer who could achieve both technical perfection and emotional depth, 'Happy' might've been my early autumn jam. But delivered in Lewis's lovely-but-vacant style, I'm gonna have to rifle through my iPod for a more substantial diva anthem".

== Chart performance ==
On 10 November 2009, after two days of sales in the UK, "Happy" had sold 36,000 copies. By 11 November the song had sold 49,000 copies, outselling its nearest rival, The Black Eyed Peas's "Meet Me Halfway", by 5,000 copies; however, on 13 November it was confirmed that "Meet Me Halfway" was outselling "Happy". "Happy" entered the UK chart at number two, marking Lewis's sixth consecutive top five single in the UK. On 7 January 2010 the song was certified Silver in the UK. "Happy" debuted on the US Billboard Hot 100 at number 50, with sales of almost 52,000 digital downloads, Later, the single managed to reach number 31. Also, in the same week it debuted at position 22 on the Hot Digital Songs chart, the Hot Gospel Songs at number 26, and at number 15 in the Canadian Hot 100, where it was the highest debut of the week. In January, it was certified Gold in Canada. The song made its first European chart appearance when it debuted at 25 in Sweden on 2 October 2009, peaking at number 11 the following week. The song entered the Australian ARIA Singles Chart at number 44 before dropping out of the top 50 the following week, it then re-entered back at number 44 one month later and so far climbed to number 26. It also charted in New Zealand at 35, and in the Japan Hot 100 "Happy" peaked at number seven.

== Music video and promotion ==
Throughout the music video Lewis is wearing a bride dress. At the end of the video, the man whom she fell in love with is showing the woman he really married.

The video for "Happy" was filmed in Cuba and directed by Jake Nava on 29 September 2009. It premiered on UK music channel The Box on 17 October 2009. At the start of the video, Lewis is shown smiling at a wedding. In the next scenes, she meets a man and, eventually, they become friends, but she starts falling in love with him. Throughout the video, it shows how Lewis is getting ready for the wedding day. The wedding proceeds and it is revealed that he marries a different woman. At the end she is left smiling, dressed in her white bridesmaid's outfit, watching the happy couple dance and trying to be happy for them.

"Happy" had its radio premiere on 6 September 2009 on The Radio 1 Chart Show on BBC Radio 1 in the UK. Lewis performed the song on the fourth season finale of America's Got Talent on 16 September 2009, and at the VH1 Divas concert on 17 September 2009. On 26 October, Lewis was a guest on the BBC's The One Show where she talked about "Happy", Echo and her pictorial autobiography, Dreams. She performed "Happy" in the MTV Europe Music Awards 2009 on 5 November 2009, in The X Factor on 8 November 2009 and The Paul O'Grady Show on 9 November 2009. Other performances include on 17 November 2009 in Dancing with the Stars and on 19 November 2009 in The Ellen DeGeneres Show. "Happy" was used in the second trailer of the film Precious: Based on the Novel "Push" by Sapphire. The Jason Nevins remix of the song was used as runway-soundtrack for the 2009 Victoria's Secret Fashion Show airing on 1 December 2009.

== Track listings ==
- Digital download (UK)
1. "Happy" – 4:02
2. "Happy" (Jason Nevins radio edit) – 4:19
- Digital EP
1. "Happy" – 4:01
2. "Let It Rain" – 3:42
3. "Happy" (Jason Nevins remix edit) – 4:19
4. "Happy" (music video) – 3:58
- CD single
1. "Happy" (Leona Lewis, Ryan Tedder, Evan Bogart) – 4:02
2. "Let It Rain" (Lewis, John Shanks, Danielle Brisebois) – 3:42
- Japanese EP
1. "Happy" – 4:02
2. "Let It Rain" – 3:42
3. "Fly Here Now"
4. "Happy" (Jason Nevins Remix)

== Credits and personnel ==
=== "Happy" ===
Recording

- Recorded at RAK Studios, London, England; Chalice Recording Studios, Los Angeles, California; Henson Recording Studios, Los Angeles, California; Park Hill Studios, Denver, Colorado.
- Mixed at Soapbox Studios, Atlanta, Georgia.
- Engineered at RAK Studios, London, England; Chalice Recording Studios, Los Angeles, California; Henson Recording Studios, Los Angeles, California.

Personnel

- Songwriting – E. Kidd Bogart, Leona Lewis, Ryan Tedder
- Production – Ryan Tedder
- Vocal production – Ryan Tedder, Leona Lewis
- Arrangement – Ryan Tedder
- Engineering – Ryan Tedder, Craig Durrance, Joe Zook, Noel Zancanella
- Additional engineering – Chris Kasych, Richard Woodcraft, Nicholas Essig
- Background vocals – Ryan Tedder
- Mixing – Phil Tan
- Additional mixing – Daniel Lewis
- Piano, acoustic guitar, drums, programming – Ryan Tedder
- Cello – Brent Kutzle

=== "Let It Rain" ===
Personnel

- Songwriting – Leona Lewis, Danielle Brisebois, John Shanks
- Vocal production – Leona Lewis

"Let It Rain" credits adapted from "Happy" CD single, and "Happy" credits adapted from the liner notes of Echo, published by Syco Music, J Records, Sony Music.

== Charts ==
=== Weekly charts ===
Chart (2009–2010)	Peak position
Australia (ARIA)	26
Austria (Ö3 Austria Top 40)	2
Belgium (Ultratip Bubbling Under Flanders)	6
Belgium (Ultratop 50 Wallonia)	21
Canada Hot 100 (Billboard)	15
Canada AC (Billboard)	25
CIS Airplay (TopHit)	37
Czech Republic Airplay (ČNS IFPI)	11
Denmark (Tracklisten)	25
Europe (European Hot 100 Singles)	3
Germany (GfK)	3
Hungary (Rádiós Top 40)	17
Ireland (IRMA)	3
Japan Hot 100 (Billboard)	6
Netherlands (Dutch Top 40 Tipparade)	11
Netherlands (Single Top 100)	74
New Zealand (Recorded Music NZ)	20
Norway (VG-lista)	17
Scottish Singles Sales (Official Charts)	2
Spain (Promusicae)	14
Sweden (Sverigetopplistan)	11
Switzerland (Schweizer Hitparade)	4
UK Singles (Official Charts)	2
UK Hip Hop/R&B (Official Charts)	2
US Billboard Hot 100	31
US Pop Airplay (Billboard)	32

=== Year-end charts ===
Chart (2009)	Position
Germany (Official German Charts)	91
Hungary (Rádiós Top 40)	113
Taiwan (Yearly Singles Top 100)	81
UK Singles (OCC)	83

Chart (2010)	Position
Europe (European Hot 100 Singles)	61
Japan (Japan Hot 100)	74
Japan Adult Contemporary (Billboard)	36

== Certifications ==
Region	Certification	Certified units/sales
Canada (Music Canada)	Gold	20,000^{*}
United Kingdom (BPI)	Silver	200,000^{^}
^{*} Sales figures based on certification alone.^{^} Shipments figures based on certification alone.

== Release history ==
Release dates and formats for "Happy"
Region	Date	Format(s)	Label(s)	Ref.
United Kingdom	6 September 2009	Streaming	Syco	
United States	15 September 2009	Digital download	J	
United States	21 September 2009	Contemporary hit radio; hot adult contemporary radio	Syco; J; RCA	
Canada	6 November 2009	Digital download (EP)	Sony Music	
Germany	6 November 2009	CD	Sony Music	
United Kingdom	8 November 2009	Digital download	Syco	
Hong Kong	9 November 2009	CD	Sony Music	
United Kingdom	9 November 2009	CD	Syco	
Japan	11 November 2009	Maxi CD	Ariola	
Germany	4 December 2009	Digital download (EP)	Sony Music	

== Notes ==
- Lewis, Leona (2009), Leona Lewis Echo, Wise publications, ISBN 978-1-84938-396-7
