= Heart of Glass =

Heart of Glass may refer to:

- Heart of Glass (film), 1976 film directed by Werner Herzog
- "Heart of Glass" (song), 1978 song by Blondie
- "Heart of Glass", a song by Celine Dion from Courage
- Heart of Glass (novel), 2007 novel in the A-List series by Zoey Dean
- "Heart of Glass", television episode from CSI: NY season 3

== See also ==
- Glass Heart, 2018 album by Mel Parsons
- Glassheart, 2012 album by Leona Lewis
  - "Glassheart" (song), a song from the album
- Cœur de verre, 1996 album by Hélène Ségara
- Herz aus Glas (disambiguation)
