= Lovebird (song) =

Single by Leona Lewis

from the album Glassheart
- Released: November 16, 2012
- Studio: Pulse Recording (Los Angeles)
- Length: 3:30
- Label: Syco; Sony
- Songwriters: Bonnie McKee; Joshua "Ammo" Coleman; Lukasz "Dr. Luke" Gottwald
- Producers: Josh Abrahams; Ammo; Oligee

Leona Lewis singles chronology
"Trouble" (2012)	"Lovebird" (2012)	"One More Sleep" (2013)

Music video
- "Lovebird" on YouTube

"Lovebird" is a song recorded by British singer-songwriter Leona Lewis for her third studio album Glassheart (2012). It was written by Bonnie McKee, Joshua "Ammo" Coleman and Lukasz "Dr. Luke" Gottwald, and produced by Josh Abrahams, Ammo and Oligee. "Lovebird" was recorded at Pulse Recording in Los Angeles and is a power ballad, incorporating a piano and synth-driven melody. The lyrics consist of Lewis informing her past lover that enough time has passed since their relationship for her to have moved on and to have developed as a person. Critics praised Lewis' vocal performance, likening her technical abilities to those of Mariah Carey and Whitney Houston. The musical structure of the song was heavily compared to one of her previous singles, "Bleeding Love", along with songs performed by Adele. The accompanying music video shows Lewis trying to escape from a giant bird cage.

To promote "Lovebird", Lewis performed the song on talk shows Daybreak and Loose Women in the United Kingdom, in addition to singing competition La Voz in Spain. Nonetheless, "Lovebird" sold fewer than 600 copies upon its release, failing to attain one of the top 200 chart positions on the UK Singles Chart; however, two weeks after the release of Glassheart, "Lovebird" peaked at number 22 on the South Korea Gaon Single Chart due to strong digital download sales.

== Background ==
On New Years Day 2012, a low quality snippet of "Lovebird" leaked under the title "Love Birds". After the song leaked, Lewis expressed her frustration at the song being available for listening to on the Internet, stating: "I'm sad that one of my songs leaked. As an artist that holds music dear to my heart I would've liked to share it with u [sic] when it's ready. I hope that you feel it like I do and when it's time to be released you'll still support it in the right way. Thank u [sic] for the love." That same month, it was announced that the album was expected to be released on 26 March 2012. Record executive Simon Cowell later publicly give his support for Glassheart, saying to Lewis that, although there had been a lengthy wait of two years for new music, the album was "sensational", and that Lewis had "never sounded better."

== Release ==
In October 2012, "Trouble" was released as Glassheart's lead single. Lewis then announced that "Fireflies" would serve as the album's second single; a lyric video for the song was uploaded to Lewis' official VEVO account on 26 October 2012. However, when Lewis appeared as a special guest performer at the London Oxford Street Christmas light switch-on event on 5 November 2012, she introduced "Lovebird" as the second single and performed it for the first time. It was later confirmed by Sony Music that "Lovebird" had replaced "Fireflies" as the album's second single, and that it would be released as the lead single for the album in Europe. "Lovebird" was made available for download in Finland, the Netherlands, Portugal and Switzerland on 16 November 2012. It was released in France, Italy and Spain a few days later on 19 November 2012. In the United Kingdom, "Lovebird" was not released as a standalone digital download; occasionally record labels will select a song to be a single and promote the release for a particular date ("impact date"), without the single being listed separately from the album in digital download stores. The song was available to purchase as an individual album track and was given an impact date of 9 December 2012. It was released in Germany on 12 April 2013.

== Production and composition ==
"Lovebird" was written by Bonnie McKee, Joshua Coleman and Dr. Luke, and produced by Josh Abrahams, Oligee, and Coleman (under his production name, Ammo). The song was engineered by Ryan Williams, assisted by Daniela Rivera. "Lovebird" was mixed by Phil Tan at the Ninja Beat Club in Atlanta, Georgia and mastered by Colin Leonard at SING Mastering using SING Technology, both located in Atlanta. The song was recorded at Pulse Recording in Los Angeles. "Lovebird" is a power ballad of three minutes and thirty seconds. The song's musical structure bears strong resemblances to one of Lewis' previous singles, "Bleeding Love", from her début studio album Spirit (2007). The track opens with a piano introduction similar to that on "Bleeding Love", and features an "instantly hummable chorus". Lewis informs her lover in the lyrics – with the lines "But the time went on, the wind has blown, and I have grown" – that enough time has passed since their relationship started for her to have developed as a person. As power ballad beats and "airy synths" play, she sings "Your lovebird's flying away/ Cos my heart's been stuck in a cage". The hook consists of Lewis singing "I've got to sing my song, so pretty/ Dum, dum, diddy".

== Critical reception ==
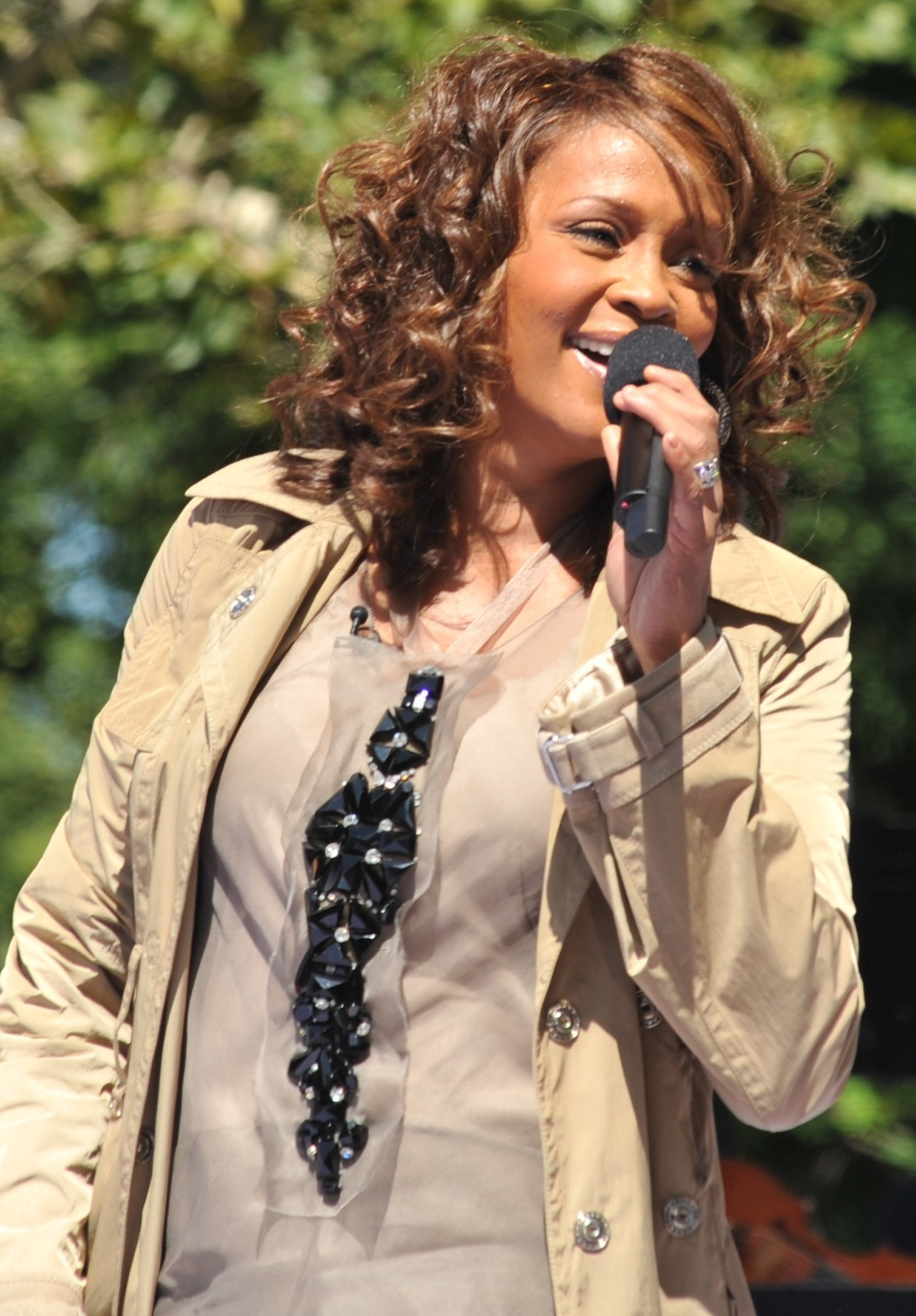
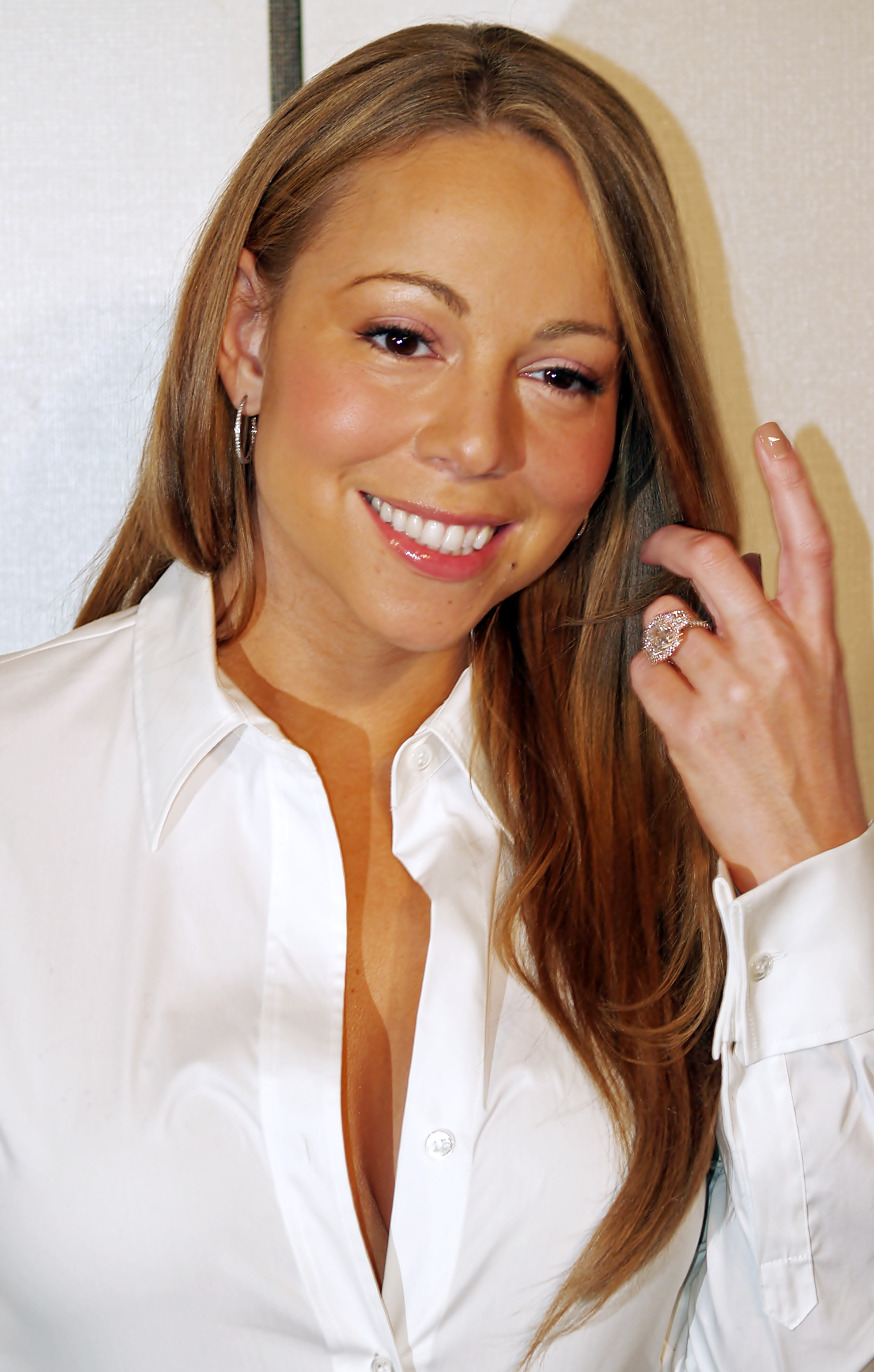
Hermoine Hoby for The Observer thought that Lewis' vocal performance on "Lovebird" is just as "technically irreproachable" as Whitney Houston's (pictured, left) and Mariah Carey's (pictured, right) voices.

Mike Wass, a writer for Idolator, wrote that "Lovebird" was one of the two best songs on Glassheart, along with the title track. He further commented that it had strong radio potential, and that it would be successful if it were to be released in the United States, as it sounds like a "clone" of "Bleeding Love". Digital Spy critic Lewis Corner felt that the song was reminiscent of "Bleeding Love" as well as "Better in Time". Although he noted that Lewis' vocal performance on "Lovebird" is very impressive, as with all her material, he was unsure of why it was included on the final cut of the album due to Glassheart having "bigger" songs on it, which were likely to chart better. The Mirror's Clemmie Moodie thought that although the recording is a "catchy" song, it does not compare to "Bleeding Love", but noted that it does contain "lyrical gems", including "Your lovebird's flyin’ away, ’cos my heart's been stuck in a cage". Hermoine Hoby, writing on behalf of The Observer, wrote that Lewis appears to be following in the footsteps of singer-songwriter Adele, due to the inclusion of "big heartfelt ballads" such as "Lovebird" and "Fireflies" on Glassheart. For Hoby, Lewis' vocals are just as "technically irreproachable" as Whitney Houston's and Mariah Carey's.

== Live performances and music video ==
Lewis performed "Lovebird" for the first time at the switching-on of the Christmas lights at Oxford Street in London on 5 November 2012; she also performed "Trouble". The singer performed the song live on Daybreak on 23 November 2012, on Loose Women on 29 November 2012 and again on 8 December 2012 at the National Lottery Awards. To promote the song in Spain, Lewis sung "Lovebird" on La Voz in December 2012.

The song's accompanying music video was filmed in November 2012 and premiered on 5 December 2012. The video has a metaphorical theme, and features Lewis in a giant bird cage in a dimly lit room. Some scenes show the singer in a shadow and darker settings, while others are light and colourful. For most of the video, Lewis ponders about being able to escape her cage and experience freedom. At the end of the video, she realises that the cage is in fact unlocked and she is able to leave her confine, and leaves.

== Track listing ==
Digital download

1. "Lovebird" – 3:30

Digital single

1. "Lovebird" – 3:30
2. "Lovebird" (music video) – 3:29

== Credits and personnel ==
Recording

- Recorded at Pulse Recording, Los Angeles, California.
- Mixed at Ninja Beat Club, Atlanta, Georgia.
- Mastered at SING Mastering, Atlanta, Georgia.

Personnel

- Songwriting – Bonnie McKee, Joshua Coleman, Lukasz Gottwald
- Production – Josh Abrahams, Oligee, Ammo
- Engineering – Ryan Williams
- Additional/assistant engineering – Daniela Rivera
- Mixing – Phil Tan
- Mastering – Colin Leonard

== Chart and commercial performance ==
Upon the release of Glassheart, "Lovebird" debuted on the South Korea Digital International Singles chart at number 73 in the issue dated 24 November 2012. The following week, it peaked at number 20. On the South Korea Download International Singles chart, the song debuted at number 68, with sales of 4,310, on 24 November 2012, and peaked at number 22 the following week, with sales of 10,413. In the United Kingdom, "Lovebird" was given an impact date of 9 December 2012, meaning it was only available to purchase as an album track rather than a traditional separate single release. In the chart week immediately after, "Lovebird" sold fewer than 600 copies, meaning it failed to attain one of 200 chart positions on the UK Singles Chart. As a result, "Lovebird" became Lewis' lowest selling single of her career thus far, and her first release to not chart in the UK.

Chart (2012)	Peak position
South Korea International Digital Singles (Gaon)	20
South Korea International Download Singles (Gaon)	22

== Release history ==
List of countries, showing release dates, formats, and record labels
Country	Release date	Format	Label
Finland	16 November 2012	Digital download	Sony Music
Netherlands	16 November 2012	Digital download	Sony Music
Portugal	16 November 2012	Digital download	Sony Music
Switzerland	16 November 2012	Digital download	Sony Music
France	19 November 2012	Digital download	Sony Music
Italy	19 November 2012	Digital download	Sony Music
Spain	19 November 2012	Digital download	Sony Music
United Kingdom	9 December 2012	Impact day	Syco Music, Sony Music
Germany	12 April 2013	Digital download	Sony Music
