= Hurt: The EP =

2011 extended play by Leona Lewis

EP / Single by Leona Lewis
- Released: 9 December 2011
- Recorded: 2011
- Studio: London, UK – MyAudioTonic (The Matrix) and TwentyOne
- Length: 11:25
- Label: Syco; RCA
- Producer: Steve Robson; Fraser T. Smith

Leona Lewis chronology
"Collide" (2011)	Hurt: The EP (2011)	"Trouble" (2012)

Hurt: The EP is the first EP by English singer Leona Lewis. It was released on 9 December 2011 by Syco Music and RCA Records. The EP served as something to bridge the gap for her fans whilst she finished recording her third studio album Glassheart (2012). The album was supposed to be released in November 2011, but was delayed to March 2012, and again to November 2012. Lewis's reason for delaying the album was because after she met producer Fraser T. Smith, the singer wanted to collaborate on new material for possible inclusion on Glassheart. As a result, Smith also produced Hurt: The EP. The EP consists of three cover versions: "Hurt" by Nine Inch Nails; "Iris" by the Goo Goo Dolls and "Colorblind" by Counting Crows. Musically, the songs are influenced by rock music, whilst the lyrics revolve around feeling pain.

Hurt: The EP garnered a mixed response from music critics. Lewis's interpretations were both praised and criticised; some critics described her vocal performance as "spine-chilling" and a "compelling beauty", whilst others cited that it was too formulaic. The EP peaked at number seven in Scotland, number eight in the United Kingdom and number 15 in Ireland on those countries' singles charts. To promote Hurt: The EP, Lewis performed "Hurt" on the eighth series finale of The X Factor and the Royal Variety Performance in the United Kingdom, and performed "Run" on the first-season finale of US The X Factor.

== Background and development ==
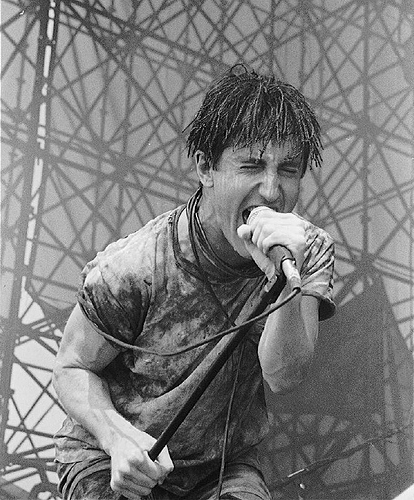
Trent Reznor of Nine Inch Nails wrote "Hurt".

Shortly after her The Labyrinth arena tour ended in July 2010, Lewis began to work on her third studio album. It was reported that Simon Cowell had set a deadline for Lewis to complete the album for a summer 2011 release. After originally having been given a release date of 28 November 2011, Glassheart was pushed back to March 2012. Lewis's reason for delaying the release of the album was that after she met producer Fraser T. Smith, she wanted to collaborate with him on new material for possible inclusion on Glassheart. Lewis delayed the release of the album a third time, with Glassheart set for release on 26 November 2012. As a result of her fans having to wait until November 2012, a year after the album was originally set to be released, Lewis decided to release an extended play entitled Hurt: The EP, as something to "bridge the gap" while she recorded new material.

Hurt: The EP consists of three covers: "Hurt" by Nine Inch Nails, "Iris" by the Goo Goo Dolls and "Colorblind" by Counting Crows. The EP was produced by Smith. In an interview for In:Demand, Lewis explained why she chose to record the songs, saying that she thought female interpretations of them would provide a "powerful perspective", because of how the originals were sung by male vocalists. Lewis stated that she chose to record "Iris" and "Colorblind" due to how she "loved" the songs after listening to them for the first time, and added that the latter has a "beautiful lyric". The EP was only made available to purchase digitally, and it was released in Canada, Ireland and the United Kingdom on 9 December 2011 to download via iTunes. It was also made available to purchase on Amazon.co.uk on 11 December 2011. Hurt: The EP was released in the United States on 17 January 2012. The US track listing consists of "Hurt", "Iris" and "Colorblind", as well as a single mix of Lewis's cover of "Run". It was also made available to purchase on Amazon.com on the same day.

== Composition and critical reception ==
Hurt: The EP garnered a mixed response from music critics. Lewis Corner for Digital Spy was complimentary of Lewis's rock song interpretations. He wrote that the title track, which contains lyrics about heroin addiction, displays the singer's "emotive tones" on which she sings in "spine-chilling" falsetto notes. He continued to write that "Hurt" has a "compelling beauty" and "haunting quality". Corner cited her cover of "Iris" as a "surprise highlight," writing that she quivers the lyrics "And I don't want the world to see me/ 'Cause I don't think that they'd understand," over a piano. He described "Colorblind"'s composition as a "symphony of strings." Rhetta Akamatsu for The Times of India wrote that Lewis's renditions were "powerful" and "spectacular". Akamatsu described "Hurt" as a song which features "chills and thrills as the rawness of the lyrics meets the purity of Lewis's voice." She also noted that Lewis's version is not based on the arrangement of the original by Nine Inch Nails, but rather that of Johnny Cash's cover, which was included on his 2002 album American IV: The Man Comes Around. Akamatsu concluded her review of the songs with "All three performances feature intense, literate lyrics and are well-suited to Lewis's style."

"Hurt"
A 25 second sample of "Hurt". In the sample, Lewis displays "emotive tones" and "spine-chilling" falsetto notes, according to Lewis Corner for Digital Spy.

Priya Elan for NME was critical of Lewis's execution of the song "Hurt", writing that she sounds as though the singer took "too much Night Nurse the evening before." Elan noted that the composition of "Hurt" was similar to that of Lewis's cover of "Run", writing "there's an awful lot of layered build up to the chorus before a full band and orchestra come in during the second verse." However, Elan concluded her review saying that although she appears not to know the legacy of the song, Lewis sounds "pretty". Katherine St. Asaph for PopDust described Lewis's interpretation of "Hurt" as being formulaic like a "template", writing that it is something that American Idol and The X Factor winners and contestants seem do when covering a song. St. Asaph continued to explain her opinions with regard to Lewis and "Hurt", writing "For Leona, that's big notes in bigger arrangements, with a couple hushed sections for contrast." She was also skeptical of Lewis's emotive abilities, writing "Either she knows that quiet-to-loud arrangements and whispered vocals can simulate gravitas pretty well [...] or she’s genuinely feeling something."

Due to the mixed response "Hurt" received from fans and critics alike, Lewis defended her decision to record the song in an interview with BBC Radio 1, saying "I actually am a big fan of that song and a big fan of the Johnny Cash cover. But that song in particular really speaks to me. Lyrically it's a song that is very intense and has painful lyrics. It's reflective of a place where I was at. When I recorded it, it was healing to get it out."

== Promotion ==
As part of promotion for Hurt: The EP, Lewis performed "Hurt" on the eighth series finale of The X Factor on 10 December 2011. The performance saw Lewis sing at Wembley Arena wearing a red full-length dress. Katherine St. Asaph for Popdust was critical of Lewis's interpretation of "Hurt" on The X Factor, writing "It's written right into the X Factor contract that in order to consent to being televised, you must permanently forfeit all ability to feel pain or any other emotion, making it somewhat difficult to interpret a song." The following week, Lewis performed "Hurt" at the 2011 Royal Variety Performance. Lewis held a competition for people to submit dress designs for her performance, with the singer wearing a black and beige coloured gown designed by winner Lilyana Maslenishka. Lewis also performed "Somebody to Love" with Cee Lo Green, a tribute to British rock band Queen. The show was recorded on 5 December 2011 in Manchester, and aired on 13 December. Lewis performed an acoustic version of "Hurt" during a live webcam chat with her fans via Ustream, which was uploaded to her official YouTube account on 16 December 2011. In the United States, Lewis performed "Run" on the first-season finale of The X Factor USA on 22 December 2011, whilst a montage of highlights of the season were screened behind her.

== Track listing ==
Hurt: The EP
No.	Title	Writer(s)	Producer(s)	Length
1.	"Hurt" (originally by Nine Inch Nails)	Trent Reznor	Matt Furmidge; Graham Stack; Fraser T. Smith	3:40
2.	"Iris" (originally by the Goo Goo Dolls)	John Rzeznik	Smith	4:25
3.	"Colorblind" (originally by Counting Crows)	Adam Duritz; Ben Mize; Charles Chillingham; Daniel Vickrey; David Bryson; Matthew Malley	Smith	3:20
Total length:				11:25

US bonus track
No.	Title	Writer(s)	Producer(s)	Length
4.	"Run" (Single Mix) (originally by Snow Patrol)	Gary Lightbody; Jonathan Quinn; Mark McClelland; Nathan Connolly; Iain Archer	Steve Robson	4:39
Total length:				16:04

== Personnel ==
Recording Locations

- MyAudioTonic (The Matrix); London, UK
- TwentyOne Studios; London, UK

Vocals

- Lead vocals – Leona Lewis (tracks 1–4)
- Background vocals on "Run" (track 4) – Alani Gibbon, Beverley Brown, Carmen Reece, Chris Ballin, Jewell Elliott, Joy Malcolm, Ladonna Harley Peters, Lauraine Bristol, Lincoln Jean-Marie, Marvin Cotterell, Vula Malinger

Production

- Fraser T. Smith (tracks 1–3)
- Matt Furmidge (track 1)
- Graham Stack (track 1)
- Steve Robson (track 4)

Technicians and musicians

- Engineer – Jonathan Shakhovskoy (track 4)
- Mixing – Jeremy Wheatley (track 4)
- String arrangement – Wil Malone (track 4)
- Piano – Steve Robson (track 4)
- Hammond – Paul Beard (track 4)
- Bass – John Garrison (track 4)
- Drums and percussion – Karl Brazil (track 4)
- Guitar – Luke Potashnick (track 4)

Credits adapted from liner notes, American Society of Composers, Authors and Publishers (ASCAP) and Broadcast Music (BMI).

== Charts ==
Although a three track EP, Hurt: The EP charted on national singles charts. It debuted at number 15 in Ireland on 15 December 2011. The following week, it dropped to number 45. Hurt: The EP debuted and peaked at number eight on the UK Singles Chart on 24 December 2011. The EP attained at number seven position on the UK Digital Chart. In Scotland, the EP debuted and peaked at number seven on 24 December 2011.

Chart (2011)	Peak position
Ireland (IRMA)	15
Scotland (OCC)	7
UK Singles (OCC)	8

== Release history ==
Country	Date	Format	Label
Canada	9 December 2011	Digital download	Sony Music
Ireland	9 December 2011	Digital download	Syco Music
United Kingdom	9 December 2011	Digital download	Syco Music
United States	17 January 2012	Digital download	RCA Records
