= Colorblind (Counting Crows song) =

Song by Counting Crows

from the album This Desert Life
- Released: 1999
- Length: 3:23
- Label: Geffen
- Songwriters: David Bryson; Adam Duritz; Charlie Gillingham; David Immerglück; Matt Malley; Ben Mize; Dan Vickrey
- Producers: Dennis Herring; David Lowery

Audio video
- "Colorblind" on YouTube

"Colorblind" is a song by American rock band Counting Crows. Written by band members Adam Duritz and Charlie Gillingham for their third album This Desert Life (1999), production was helmed by Dennis Herring and David Lowery.

The song was prominently featured in the 1999 drama film Cruel Intentions starring Sarah Michelle Gellar, Ryan Phillippe, Reese Witherspoon, and Selma Blair, as well as a first season episode of Roswell. It has since been covered by various artists, including Kina Grannis, Between the Buried and Me (who are named after a section of lyrics in the song "Ghost Train" from the first Counting Crows album August and Everything After), Leona Lewis (for Hurt: The EP), and Natalie Walker. A choral cover recorded by Scala & Kolacny Brothers was also featured in the TV series Manhattan (season 2, episode 5, "The World of Tomorrow").

== Charts ==
=== Weekly charts ===
Chart (2013–2014)	Peak position
France (SNEP)	144

== Leona Lewis version ==
In December 2011, British recording artist Leona Lewis released a three-track extended play entitled Hurt: The EP, which included a cover version of "Colorblind" as well as two other covers. Lewis re-recorded an acoustic version of the song for inclusion on the deluxe edition of her third studio album Glassheart (2012). Fraser T Smith served as the song's producer.
