= Trouble (Leona Lewis song) =

Single by Leona Lewis featuring Childish Gambino

from the album Glassheart
- Released: 12 September 2012
- Recorded: 2011–2012
- Studio: Henson (Los Angeles); MyAudioTonic – The Matrix (London)
- Genre: R&B; trip hop
- Length: 3:42
- Label: Syco; Sony
- Songwriters: Leona Lewis; Donald Glover; Hugo Chegwin; Harry Craze; Shahid Khan; James Murray; Mustafa Omer; Emeli Sandé; Fraser T Smith
- Producers: Fraser T Smith; Naughty Boy

Leona Lewis singles chronology
"Hurt: The EP" (2011)	"Trouble" (2012)	"Lovebird" (2012)

Childish Gambino singles chronology
"Fire Fly" (2012)	"Trouble" (2012)	"Bed Peace" (2013)

Music video
- "Trouble" on YouTube

"Trouble" is a song recorded by British recording artist Leona Lewis and American entertainer Childish Gambino for Lewis' third studio album, Glassheart (2012). Inspired by Lewis' break-up with childhood sweetheart Lou Al-Chamaa, "Trouble" is a mid-tempo R&B and trip hop ballad, with a piano and strings-driven melody. It was written by a British writing collective consisting of Lewis, Donald Glover, Hugo Chegwin, Harry Craze, Shahid Khan, James Murray, Mustafa Omer, Emeli Sandé and Fraser T Smith. Production came courtesy of Khan under his production name of Naughty Boy and Smith, along with co-producer Chris Loco and additional producer Jahlil Beats. Music critics noted that the urban production marked a new direction for Lewis, particularly by featuring Gambino during the song's middle eight breakdown with a poetic rap verse. A version excluding Gambino is also included on Glassheart.

"Trouble" was also influenced by British trip hop duo Massive Attack, who Lewis cited as a musical inspiration. Lewis' falsetto and soprano vocal performance on the song garnered early praise from critics who commended the raw emotions, as well as Gambino's guest rap and the song's melodic strings- and piano-heavy production. "Trouble" premiered on 21 August 2012 on BBC Radio 1's Breakfast with Scott, ahead of its release as Glassheart's lead single, superseding the 2011 single "Collide", a collaboration with Swedish DJ and record producer Avicii. "Trouble" was released on 5 October 2012, preceding the album by one week, and entered the UK Singles Chart at number seven becoming Lewis's ninth top-ten single. In Ireland "Trouble" charted at number twenty-one becoming Lewis's eighth top-thirty single.

As part of promotion of the song, fans were given chance to produce their own remix of "Trouble" which was released alongside the single on Lewis' official music store. An accompanying music video was filmed on 22 August in Los Angeles, with Teen Wolf actor Colton Haynes cast as Lewis' love interest. Haynes, a friend of Lewis, was chosen due to his physical resemblance to Lewis' ex Al-Chaama. In the video, Lewis and Haynes' relationship begins to unfold and culminates in an altercation between the duo before Haynes leaves and Lewis breaks down in tears. Lewis also recorded an acoustic performance of the song for her Vevo account. "Trouble" was promoted with performances on the ninth series of The X Factor (UK), on 7 October 2012, later on Alan Carr: Chatty Man and also during a set at London nightclub, G-A-Y.

== Background and release ==
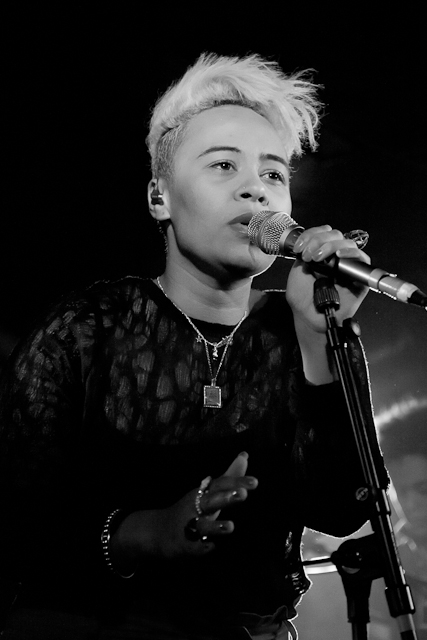
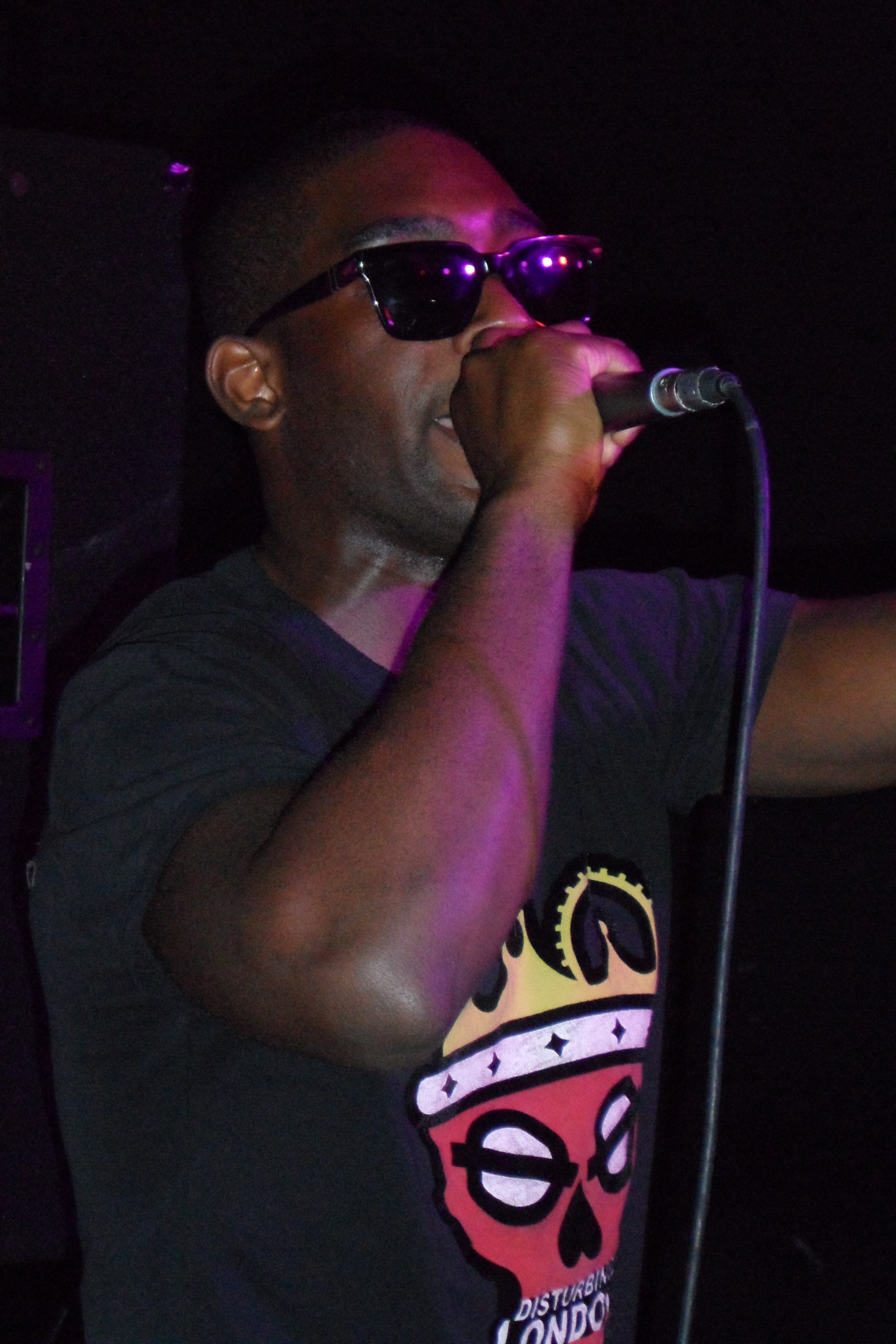
Emeli Sandé (left) wrote the initial concept for "Trouble" in 2009. Tinie Tempah (right) heard the song when working with Sandé for his own album Disc-Overy and approached Lewis to record the song as a duet.

Lewis began to conceptualise her third album Glassheart in the second half of 2010, shortly after completing her first headline concert tour, The Labyrinth. "Trouble" was one of the earlier songs recorded by Lewis, and one of several tracks that Lewis worked on with British duo Emeli Sandé and Naughty Boy. Sandé first conceived the loose concepts for "Trouble" in 2009. It was not until British hip-hop artist Tinie Tempah began working with Sandé for his own debut album Disc-Overy (2011), that "Trouble" was pitched to Lewis; Tempah approached Lewis to record "Trouble" as a duet with himself. Upon hearing the demo, Lewis asked Tempah if she could have the song and subsequently entered the recording studios with Sandé and Fraser T Smith to record and finish the song. Sandé later wrote two more songs for Lewis, including "I to You" and "Sugar". A fourth song, "Mountains", was reclaimed by Sandé and was recorded for her debut album Our Version of Events (2012).

With a November 2011 release date set for Glassheart, Lewis proceeded with the release of the album's first single "Collide" on 15 July 2011. However, Swedish house music DJ Avicii sued Lewis and Sony Music, claiming that "Collide" was a reproduction of his own instrumental single "Penguin," for which he had sought the legal permission to sample Simon Jeffes' "Perpetuum Mobile". Following a settlement out of court, "Collide" was released crediting both Lewis and Avicii. "Collide" reached number one on the US Hot Dance Club Songs chart, number three in Ireland and number four in the United Kingdom. Despite this, Glassheart was pushed into early 2012 to accommodate new recording sessions. During this time Lewis would work with Scottish DJ Calvin Harris and record a song called "We Found Love". Harris wanted Lewis to release "We Found Love" at the end of 2011, yet Lewis and her label had already decided "Trouble" would be the second single from Glassheart. During an interview with Digital Spy, Lewis said "Yes, I think 'Trouble' will be the second single. I can't wait for everyone to hear it. I'm really excited about it. It's one that I really love." Once the album was pushed back again to mid-2012, and then October 2012, Harris reclaimed "We Found Love", which was subsequently recorded by Barbadian recording artist Rihanna for her album Talk That Talk and became a number one hit worldwide.

Nearly a year later as work for the album neared completion, Lewis was able to confirm that "Trouble" would still be the album's second single and was due for release in October 2012 alongside the album. Between the announcement in 2011 and the song's release in 2012, Sony Music Entertainment re-organised operations, which resulted in the closure of J Records and all previously signed artists being absorbed into RCA Records. "Trouble" is thus Lewis' first release in partnership with RCA Records. Sony Music made "Trouble" a global priority, making it supersede "Collide" as the album's lead single and focussing on promoting the song in the UK first before a worldwide release. A new version of "Trouble" was recorded to feature American rapper Childish Gambino and premiered on radio on 21 August 2012. "Trouble" was played at a press premiere for Tracey Hart from Music Week magazine, along with new songs "Come Alive" and "Un Love Me". The song was also played for Popjustice twice, first in an early form last year in 2011 and secondly in a finished form on 16 August 2012. The website noted that the new version of "Trouble" sounded more finished and complete with the addition of Gambino's verse. "Trouble" premiered on BBC Radio 1's Breakfast with Scott on 21 August 2012, ahead of its Irish release on 5 October and UK release on 7 October 2012. It was released 14 December 2012 in Germany.

== Composition and lyrics ==
"Trouble" is a mid-tempo R&B and trip hop song written by Lewis and collective of British songwriters, including Hugo Chegwin, Harry Craze, Shahid Khan, James Murray, Mustafa Omer, Emeli Sandé and Fraser T Smith. It is primarily an R&B and trip hop song, built around a strings- and piano-driven melody. Production was done by Khan under his production name of Naughty Boy and Smith, while secondary production was provided by Chris Loco. Orlando "Jahlil Beats" Tucker provided some additional production. A reviewer from the Metro noted that the song had a hip hop vibe and feel to its production. "Trouble" was recorded in the key of A-minor and written in time signature of common time, set at a tempo of 104 beats per minute. Sony Music executive Sonny Thakrar described Lewis and Sandé's work together on "Trouble" as "killer chemistry," praising Sandé's "storytelling" abilities and Lewis' "vocal prowess". Thakrar, who is also involved with A&R, said that "Trouble" was a showcase of an "emotional and raw" vocal from Lewis. Vocals throughout the song are sung in Lewis' falsetto and soprano registers, spanning a range of E^{4–5}. The tone and mood of the song is ethereal, with Lewis' vocals taking on a "haunting" tone that is only broken during middle eight section when Childish Gambino delivers his "poetic" rap verse. "Trouble" featuring Gambino appears on Glassheart as track number thirteen, whilst a solo no-rap version appears on the album as track number one.

In a press release, Lewis explained the meaning behind "Trouble": "it tells the story of love going bad and becoming destructive, aspects of which we can all relate to. It’s a deeply emotional and poignant song that I have a real connection to." According to the Sunday Mirror, "Trouble" was inspired by Lewis' break-up with her childhood sweetheart Lou Al-Chamaa. Lyrics which reference her relationship with Chamaa include the lines: "I told you never to get used to me, I stay awake while you fall asleep. I'm a whole lot of trouble, we're in a whole lot of trouble. You shout louder than you used to, and you hold on tighter in the bedroom." During an interview with Digital Spy, Lewis further explained that she was inspired and influenced by British trip-hop pioneers Massive Attack. "Trouble" drew comparisons to Sandé's own singles; according to Michael Cragg from The Guardian, "Trouble" was much like "Heaven" (2011) while MSN's Danielle Cheeseman compared it to Sandé collaboration with Naughty Boy, "Daddy" (2011).

== Response ==
=== Critical reception ===
"Trouble" received mainly positive reviews from critics, who praised Childish Gambino's featured rap, the musical production and Lewis's emotive vocals. A reviewer from Pop Justice said that the site had twice heard "Trouble"; the first time was just before "Collide" was released in September 2011, while a second finished version was played for them on 16 August 2012. The final track featured the same "beguiling feel" as the earlier version but was more "finished." The reviewer commented, "['Trouble' has] a convincing, compelling and dramatic vocal performance which works brilliantly against the song's opulent but bleak mid-tempo production", adding that although Childish Gambino's "rap in the middle eight sounds great", it almost "slightly dilutes Leona's big comeback".

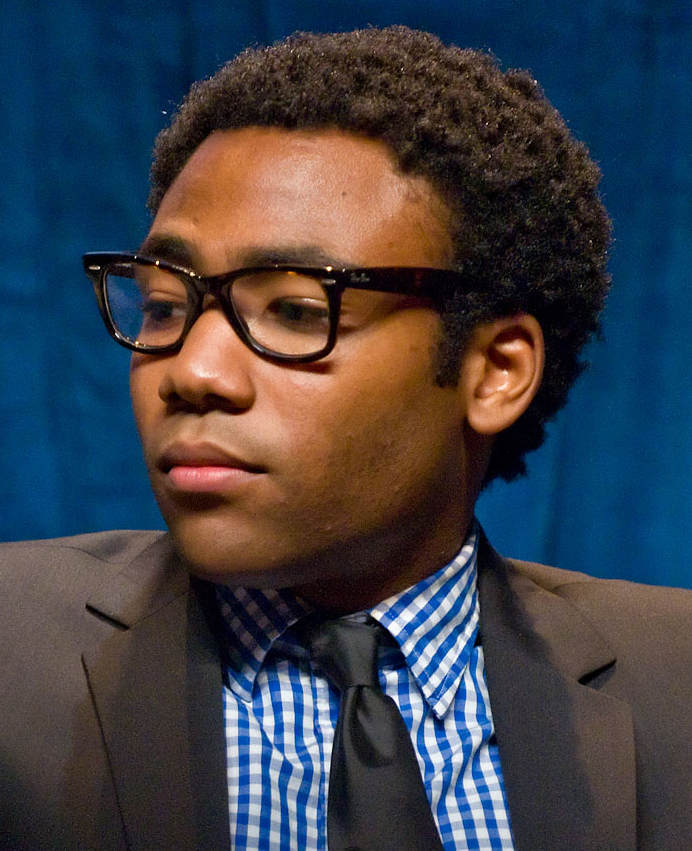
Gambino is featured during the song's middle eight with a "witty, poetic and creative verse".

During early previews of the song, Corner spoke most on Gambino's guest appearance, describing the collaboration as "unlikely on paper" but then in reality "it results in one of Leona's most natural collaborations to date". Commenting on the song as a whole, Corner said "Trouble" was a powerful comeback, "It's big, it's emotional and it's what we've come to expect from the Hackney belle – but we wouldn't want it any other way." Lewis Corner from Digital Spy also picked up on the change of direction and commented that people would be "shocked," but then added that "when "it results in an emotive anthem like this, we hope she unleashes it more often." The Guardian's Michael Cragg called "Trouble" a return to the "safer" templates of her first two albums, but praised the song's production calling it "a vaguely trip-hop beat buffeted by soaring strings and a troubled lyric in the chorus." Like previous reviews, Cragg also praised Gambino stating that he "manages to stamp his own personality on the song" despite appearing near the end of the song and that perhaps it was Lewis' best chance at "regaining her footing in America".

In a later review, Corner said that "Trouble" was built around "echoing beats and heart-tugging piano riff," which when combined with "her unmistakable falsetto" was as dramatic as a scene from the film The Hunger Games. Elena Gorgon from Softpedia echoed earlier sentiments, concluding that the song "was powerful, it's heartfelt and it confirms Leona as one of the most remarkable vocalists of the day." However MSN's Danielle Cheeseman said that "Trouble" being a safe return to what Lewis has always done wasn't necessarily a good thing. In her review, Cheeseman called the song the "same melodrama" as past Lewis songs and that due to the song sounding familiar to Sandé's song "Daddy", "Lewis has yet to find her own stride". Corner featured "Trouble" on his weekly playlist "10 Songs You Need to Hear" for the week beginning 27 August 2012. There he described elaborated that the song was a welcome return for Lewis thanks to "big beats, big strings and even bigger vocals". Whilst the majority of reviews praised Gambino's appearance on the song, Cheeseman described the collaboration as "a saviour" but that it did nothing for Lewis' "credibility". Her review was subtitled "Leona Lewis Tries to Convince Us She's 'Trouble' — We're not buyin' what she's sellin'" and concluded that if the best that Glassheart could preview after all the delays was "Trouble", "it won't be worth the wait." NME's Jeremy Allen agreed, praising the production on "Trouble" as "slick" but stating that from Lewis it does not come across with conviction nor is it believable.

=== Chart performance ===
On 12 September 2012, "Trouble" was added the C-Playlist of UK mainstream radio station BBC Radio 1. A week later it was moved up to the B-Playlist. "Trouble" made its Irish Singles Chart debut at number twenty-one, becoming her eighth top-thirty single. It is Lewis's third single after "Footprints in the Sand" (2008) and "I Got You" (2010) to miss the top five. In the United Kingdom the song fared somewhat better, debuting at number two on the R&B Singles Chart and number seven on the main UK Singles Chart. "Trouble" is the second single to miss the top five in the UK after "I Got You", but is Lewis' ninth UK top ten. In total, "Trouble" spent four weeks within the top 100. Elsewhere, song made a brief appearance Swiss Singles Chart, where it peaked at number seventy-five for one week before dropping off the chart, and at number ninety-three on the South Korea Gaon International singles chart.

== Music video ==
=== Background ===
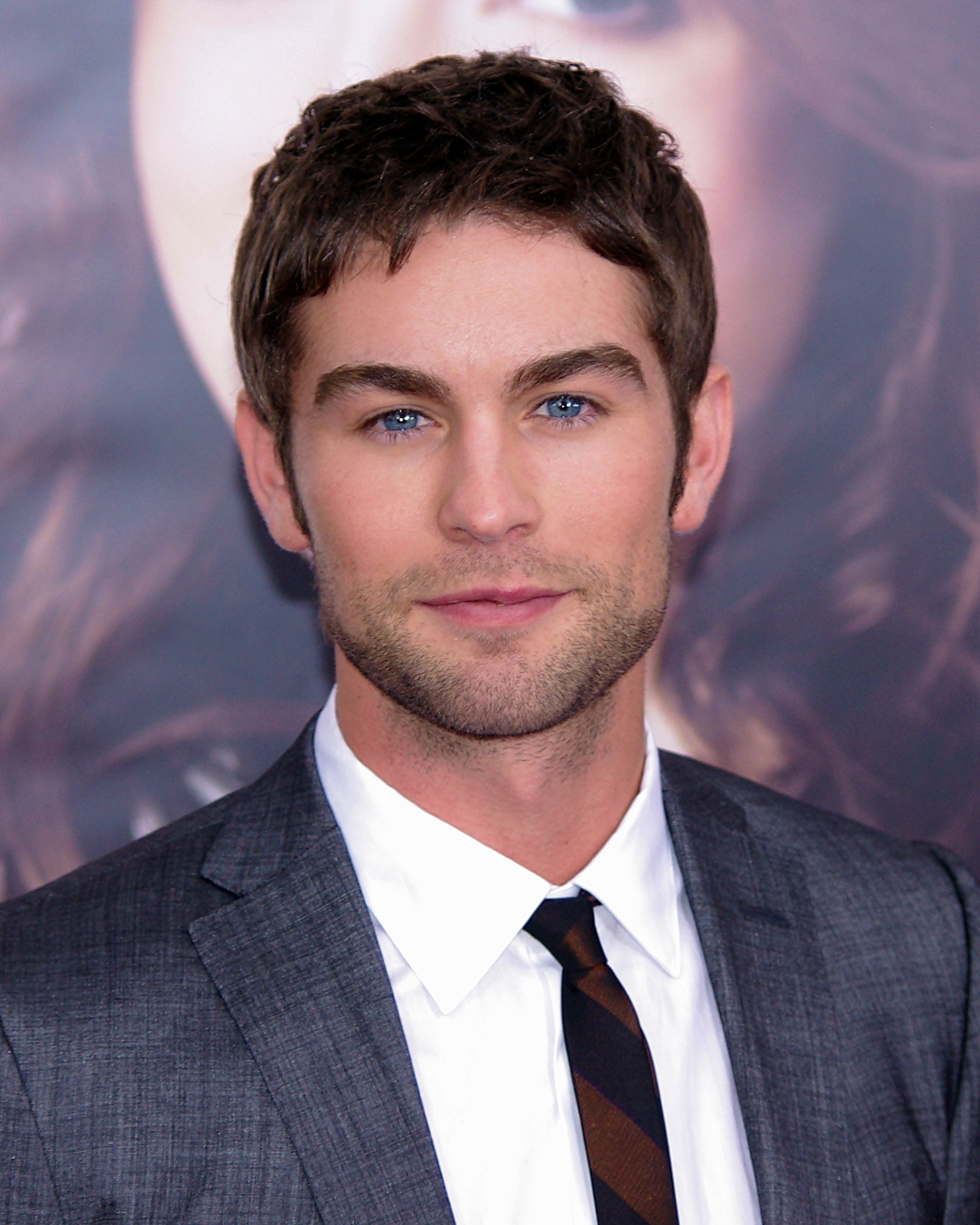
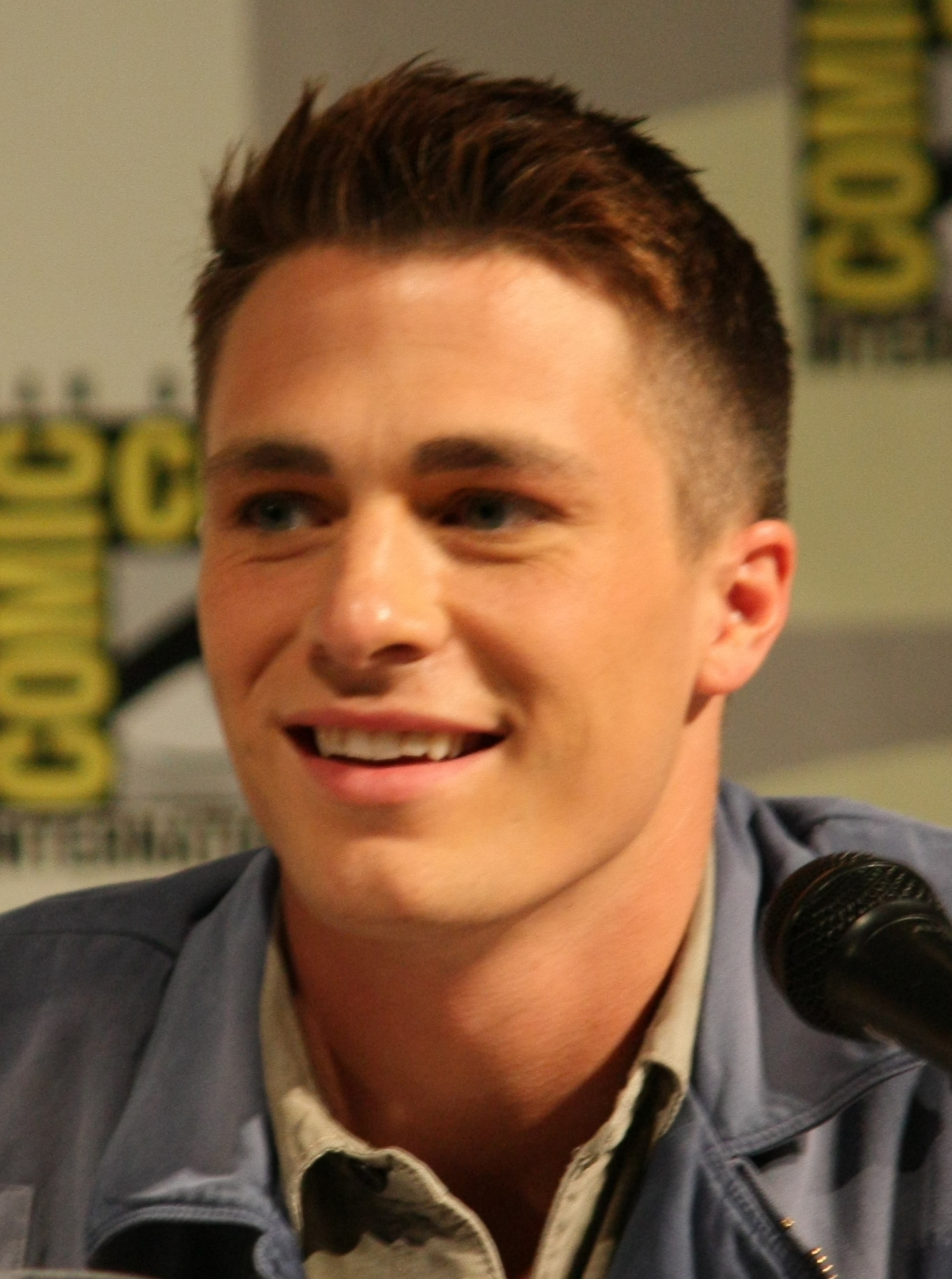
Lewis has worked with Hollywood actors before; Chace Crawford (left) was the lead man in "I Will Be" while Colton Haynes (right) plays the leading man in "Trouble".

A music video for "Trouble" began production on 22 August 2012 with Lewis confirming, via her Twitter account, that Teen Wolf actor Colton Haynes would play her love interest in the video. According to MSN's Felicity Thistlewaithe, Haynes was chosen due to his physical resemblance to Lewis' ex-boyfriend Lou Al-Chamaa, who is thought to be the inspiration for the song. Haynes said that his and Lewis' managers were good friends and thus the casting was arranged through them. Described by Capital FM as "Lewis enduring an awkward break-up" interpolated with "time[s] when the couple were happy and in love," the music video for "Trouble" uses the solo version of the song, which excludes Childish Gambino's rap verse. It was filmed in Los Angeles and is the second time that Lewis has enlisted a Hollywood actor to play a love interest, previously casting Chace Crawford to play her leading man in the video for Lewis' single "I Will Be" (2009). The video focuses on how the couple argue before walking away from each other.

Helmed by Raul B. Fernandez, the principal filming of the video took place in just one day. While filming the bedroom scene for the video, Lewis fell from the bed and injured her toe. A doctor was called on set to examine the injury, but Lewis was given the all clear and resumed filming barefoot for the rest of the video. On 29 August 2012, the official lyrics video was uploaded to Lewis' YouTube page. Two weeks later, Lewis uploaded some still images from the music video. On 14 September 2012, Lewis uploaded the official music video for "Trouble" to her VEVO account. Behind-the-scenes footage from the video shoot was released on 4 October 2012, and shows Lewis and Haynes filming each of the scenes with commentary from Fernandez, Haynes and Lewis.

=== Synopsis ===
Lewis laments the deterioration of her relationship whilst images of memorable times play on the backdrop.

The video begins with a view of the apartment that Lewis and Haynes shared. Books and a vase lay strewn across the floor, while Lewis weeps in the corner and Haynes watches from a distance teary-eyed. The video switches to several other shots of Lewis singing the first verse, looking morose. In a third shot, Lewis is seen standing on a rooftop against the Los Angeles skyline dressed in a dark red crop top. Then the video switches to Lewis standing in front of projected images of the memorable times of her relationship with Haynes. Lewis and Haynes are seen sat at opposite ends of the sofa looking into the distance, spliced with more scenes of Lewis on the rooftop. The couple are seen during an awkward dinner before switching to images of the couple in bed together, seemingly happy. As the chorus kicks in for the first time, the couple are seen arriving at a party, with Lewis wearing an aqua-coloured dress with a portion of her midriff revealed, meanwhile Haynes wears a plaid shirt and jeans. Initially the couple are content, embracing guests but socialising separately and avoiding contact with each other. The camera switches between these and the earlier scenes of Lewis in front of projected images and the LA skyline throughout the chorus. As Lewis sings "I'm a whole lot of trouble/ We're in a whole lot of trouble", she glances over to see Haynes flirting with another girl.

In the following verse, Lewis and Haynes are seen having several embraces, some joyful while others are more tense as Lewis is sad. The couple are then seen leaving the party; Haynes walks over to Lewis and attempts to kiss, but she proceeds to push him away. During the second airing of the chorus, more images of happy scenes between the couple are spliced with Lewis waking up in bed to find Haynes has slept on the sofa. More passionate embraces between the couple are seen before Lewis is seen breaking down in tears. At the breakfast that follows, the couple break into a series of arguments. Lewis shoves Haynes onto the sofa, and Haynes grabs Lewis as she turns away. Lewis then slaps Hayne around the face. During the middle eight breakdown in the song, Haynes throws books from a shelf, and Lewis throws objects at Haynes including a cushion, as well as pushing over a lamp. Haynes subsequently leaves, driving away into the distance, and Lewis falls to the wall and breaks down in tears.

=== Reception ===
Anna Lewis from Heatworld.com praised the music video and said that fans who "like listening to good tunes and looking at hot guys" would be impressed. In the review A. Lewis also commended the decision to hire Haynes and summarised by saying "Bravo Leona. Bravo." 4 Music's Chris Younie agreed calling Lewis "one lucky lady," as well as being surprised by the video. In his review Younie said "If you thought butter-wouldn't-melt in the mouth of Leona Lewis, think again, as the video gets steamy!" He concluded by praising the song and video's potential with the comment "[it] could be another No 1 for the ballad-belting beauty."

== Promotion and live performances ==
In a 24 August 2012 newsletter to fans about the upcoming release of "Trouble," it was announced that aspiring musicians and fans could produce their own remix for "Trouble" and win the chance to have their remix released along with the single. Lewis told fans, "I can't wait for you guys to start remixing 'Trouble'. It is such an important song to me and I know that you will put all your creative talents into it! I'm looking forward to hearing what you come up with and don't forget there are some great prizes to be won too!" Lewis and Fraser T Smith (co-producer and co-writer of the song) were amongst the judges for the shortlisted songs. Matty Graham won the competition, and his remix of "Trouble" was released alongside the original version as part of a Digital EP available exclusively to MyPlayDirect.com, Lewis' official music store.

On 5 September 2012, Lewis uploaded her first live performance of "Trouble" to her official Vevo account. The acoustic performance was recorded live in a studio in just one take, and was filmed in black and white. The video features a stripped vocal performance set against a minimal cello and piano production. It is one of five such acoustic performances that Lewis recorded of songs from Glassheart in August 2012. Deekay from soul music website Soulculture.co.uk praised the acoustic performance, saying that while the original version "just about added up to the sum of its individually brilliant parts", the acoustic "[is] perhaps even better than the original". The reviewer praised Lewis' balance of "powerhouse vocals with the soul and emotion that her critics claim she lacks".

A tour of local radio stations in the UK began on 17 September, lasting for four days and visiting six cities to promote both "Trouble" and Glassheart. Lewis performed "Trouble" live for the first time on ninth series of The X Factor, the same show which launched Lewis' career six years earlier. Music Week magazine was first to reveal that Lewis would be performing over the first live shows on 7 October, directly preceding the song's release. On 12 October 2012, Lewis performed "Trouble" live on Alan Carr: Chatty Man, and a day later reprised the performance during a set at G-A-Y nightclub in London. Internationally, Lewis took to the stage for second season finale of The Voice of Germany, where she performed "Trouble" as a duet with finalist Michael Lane. "Trouble" is performed as the eleventh song on the set list of Lewis' 2013 tour called the Glassheart Tour.

== Track listing ==
Digital EP

1. "Trouble" (featuring Childish Gambino) – 3:42
2. "Trouble" (Acoustic) – 3:41
3. "Trouble" (Wookie Remix) – 3:05
4. "Trouble" (Wideboys Radio Mix) – 3:46
5. "Trouble" (Matty Graham Remix) – 3:56 [Leona Lewis Music Store Bonus Track]

Digital download

1. "Trouble" (featuring Childish Gambino) – 3:42

CD single / Digital Single

1. "Trouble" (featuring Childish Gambino) – 3:42
2. "Trouble" (Acoustic) – 3:41

== Credits ==
Recording

- Recorded at Henson Recording Studios in Los Angeles and MyAudioTonic Studios (The Matrix) in London, United Kingdom.
- Mixed at Ninja Beat Club, Atlanta, Georgia.
- Mastered at SING Mastering, Atlanta, Georgia.

Personnel

- Beatriz Artola – music engineer, recording engineer
- Hugo "Hoax" Chegwin – songwriter
- Harry "Craze" – songwriter
- Childish Gambino – guest vocals
- LaDonna Harley-Peters – background vocals
- Shahid "Naughty Boy" Khan – record producer, songwriter
- Leona Lewis – lead vocalist, songwriter
- Chris Loco – co-producer, programming
- James Murray – songwriter
- Mustafa Omer – songwriter
- Emeli Sandé – songwriter
- Fraser T Smith – songwriter, record producer, piano, keyboard, drums, percussion, programming
- Jahlil Beats – additional producer, programming
- Seth Waldmaan – recording engineer

Credits adapted from album booklet.

== Charts ==
Chart (2012)	Peak position
Austria (Ö3 Austria Top 40)	32
Germany (GfK)	27
Ireland (IRMA)	21
Portugal (AFP)	32
Scottish Singles Sales (Official Charts)	8
South Korea International Chart (Gaon)	23
Switzerland (Schweizer Hitparade)	75
UK Hip Hop/R&B (Official Charts)	2
UK Singles (Official Charts)	7

== Radio adds and release history ==
List of release dates, showing country, record label, and format
Region	Date	Format	Label
United Kingdom	21 August 2012	Radio premiere	Syco Music
United Kingdom	12 September 2012	Mainstream airplay	Syco Music
Ireland	5 October 2012	Digital Extended play (EP)	Sony Music
Austria	7 October 2012	Digital Extended play (EP)	Sony Music
Switzerland	7 October 2012	Digital Extended play (EP)	Sony Music
United Kingdom	7 October 2012	Digital Extended play (EP)	Syco Music
Sweden	31 October 2012	Digital Extended play (EP)	Sony Music
Switzerland	2 November 2012	Digital download	Sony Music
Germany	14 December 2012	CD single; Digital EP	Sony Music
Switzerland	14 December 2012	Digital Single	Sony Music
