= Herz aus Glas =

Herz aus Glas (German for "heart of glass") may refer to:

- Heart of Glass (film), a 1976 German film directed and produced by Werner Herzog titled Herz aus Glas in German
  - Herz aus Glas (album), a 1977 album by German band Popol Vuh as a soundtrack to the Werner Herzog film
- "Herz aus Glas", a 1979 German-language remake of Blondie's 1979 song "Heart of Glass" by Marianne Rosenberg
- "Herz aus Glas" (Münchener Freiheit song), a 1986 song by Münchener Freiheit (band) from the album Traumziel
- "Herz aus Glas", a 2002 song by German singer Ben

== See also ==
- Heart of Glass (disambiguation)
