= Glassheart =

Studio album by Leona Lewis
- Released: 12 October 2012
- Recorded: Late 2010 – 10 September 2012
- Studios: Denver, Colorado (Patriot); London, UK (Air, Air Edel, Angel Recording, The Dairy, Metropolis, MyAudioTonic (The Matrix), The Pool); Los Angeles, California (2nd Floor, Harmony Recording, Henson Recording, Side 3, Pulse, Westlake Recording, UMPG)
- Genres: Pop; dance; dance-pop
- Length: 48:51
- Label: Syco
- Producers: Josh Abraham; Ammo; Naughty Boy; Craigie Dodds; DJ Frank E; Ira Glansbeeik; Rodney Jerkins; Tommy King; Oligee; Al Shux; Fraser T Smith; Ryan Tedder; Sandy Vee; Noel Zancanella

Leona Lewis chronology
The Labyrinth Tour: Live from the O2 (2010)	Glassheart (2012)	Christmas, with Love (2013)

Alternate cover
- Deluxe edition artwork

Singles from Glassheart
- 1. "Trouble" Released: 12 September 2012; 2. "Lovebird" Released: 16 November 2012

Glassheart is the third studio album by English singer Leona Lewis, released on 12 October 2012 by Syco Music. Glassheart was conceived in 2010 shortly after the completion of Lewis' first headline tour, The Labyrinth. Recording and production took place in Denver, Los Angeles and London; originally the album was due for release in November 2011 but was pushed back several times to accommodate new recording sessions and allow more creative time. The album was the first – and so far only – of Lewis' albums not released in North America.

On Glassheart, Lewis reunites with Ryan Tedder, record producer of her previous singles "Bleeding Love" and "Happy" and songwriter Andrea Martin who co-wrote "Better in Time", in addition to a number of new collaborators such as British duo Naughty Boy and Emeli Sandé, Rodney "Darkchild" Jerkins and DJ Frank E. Producer Fraser T Smith executive produced the album after impressing Lewis with his work on Hurt: The EP (2011), a cover song extended play (EP) that Lewis released to bridge the gap between Echo (2009) and Glassheart.

"Collide", a collaboration with house music DJ Avicii, was released on 2 September 2011. Originally a song by just Lewis, Avicii sued Sony Music claiming that the song plagiarised his own instrumental "Penguin". Through mutual agreement it was released as a collaboration, becoming a top-five hit in the UK and Lewis' first to top the US Billboard Hot Dance Club Songs chart. The Afrojack remix of "Collide" is the only version to feature on Glassheart. Subsequent singles "Trouble" featuring American rapper Childish Gambino and "Lovebird" were less successful, the former reaching the top ten in the UK and top thirty in Ireland, while the latter sold fewer than 600 copies in the UK and failed to chart anywhere in Europe.

Glassheart received a mixed reception from critics, who praised the vocals and experimental use of dubstep and electronic music but were less impressed with the album's many ballads. In the UK, the album was Lewis' first album not to reach number one, debuting at number three with 27,000 copies in its first week. Elsewhere the album became Lewis' third top-five album in Ireland, and upon its international release in November 2012, reached the top thirty in some of continental Europe. Following a 2013 release for Austria and Germany, Glassheart peaked at number five and six respectively, outperforming previous album Echo. In April 2013, Lewis embarked on the Glassheart Tour, in support of the album, visiting Switzerland, Germany and the UK.

== Background and release ==
Lewis completed her first headline tour The Labyrinth in July 2010 and soon after began making plans for her then-untitled third album. Recording and production officially began in late 2010 with a view to releasing the album in November 2011. Originally "Collide", a collaboration with Swedish DJ Avicii, was released in August 2011, with the album to follow in November. However, Lewis was inspired to continue making music and used her Facebook account to announce that the album was being pushed back into early 2012. 26 March 2012 was confirmed as the new release date for Glassheart. To bridge the gap between Echo (2009) and Glassheart, Lewis teamed with British producer Fraser T Smith to record Hurt: The EP, an extended play (EP) of cover songs that was released in December. In January 2012, Lewis announced that the album was being pushed back again, this time to November 2012. During an interview with Digital Spy, Lewis confirmed that she had recorded with Scottish DJ Calvin Harris and that Smith had been brought on board to help with production. In April 2012, in an interview at the Ariella Couture fashion show, Lewis stated, "I'm now planning to have the album out in the summer [of 2012]. Simon Cowell has heard some of the tracks and he loves it". Cowell would later publicly offer his support, declaring to Lewis that although there had been a wait of two years for new music, "I think this new album is sensational, you've never sounded better."

I had a provisional deadline but I was still in the midst of recording and didn't feel like I'd got the crux of the album. So I kept going and kept writing and then I got Fraser T Smith involved, who went on to executive produce all the songs.

— Lewis talking to the Birmingham Mail.

On 21 June 2012, Smith spoke to Music Week about Glassheart being released on 26 November 2012. Scrapping many of the earlier recorded tracks (see recording sessions), Smith said he was "taking a production role for the whole album as well as co-authoring about half its tracks". Lewis would later talk of the album's delay and Smith's involvement, describing the original release dates as rough guides. Following Lewis' performance at BBC Radio 1's Hackney Weekend, Smith revealed that the album was 80% complete, "We've got the key tracks and we're very close." Describing the process as a stark contrast to previous albums Spirit and Echo, Smith said that when you work with many producers "you end up with maybe two or three radio songs and not necessarily the album sales you want." Lewis spoke to reporters back stage after the performance, revealing that the album had been brought forward a month to October 2012. By the time July had come around, Smith updated fans to say that the album was now 97% complete.

At the end of August, Lewis began selecting the track listing and approving the final audio mixes and masters of the songs. On 5 September 2012, Lewis used Twitter to communicate with Smith and inform him that she was approaching the end of listening to all the final mixes. Lewis unveiled the final track listing for the standard edition on 9 September, naming twelve songs, but excluding the album's first single "Collide". Smith confirmed that the final decisions had been made and that the album was 100% complete on 10 September. A two-disc deluxe edition was to be released alongside the standard version as per a Lewis question and answer session with fans. Thirty-second snippets of each song were released on 5 October. The album itself was released on 12 October in Ireland and 15 October in the United Kingdom.

== Recording sessions ==
Among the first people to work with Lewis was her frequent collaborator Ryan Tedder who penned and produced multiple songs both on Spirit (2007) and Echo (2009). The album is named after "Glassheart", a song recorded in sessions with Tedder in Denver, Colorado, when Lewis asked for a song that she could "dance and jump around [to]". The song's other co-writers were Noel Zancanella and OneRepublic guitarist Brent Kutzle. Kutzle, Zancanella and Tedder worked with Lewis on another song called "Burn". A snippet of "Burn" was used during an interview with Clive Davis which aired on 23 October 2011. Davis headed Lewis' former US label J Records before joining RCA Records when the former was folded. Davis had previously played a part in the A&R division for Lewis' albums. The CBS interview titled Clive "The Music Man" Davis – Interview showed Davis talking about Lewis branching out to work with American producers, and about previewing songs before they were presented to Lewis. However, when the track listing for the album was unveiled, "Burn" was omitted in favour of another Zancanlla/Lewis/Tedder track, recorded with Roland Orzabal and Curt Smith, titled "Favourite Scar". "Burn" would later be recorded by British singer-songwriter Ellie Goulding for Halcyon Days (2013), the re-release of her second album Halcyon (2012).

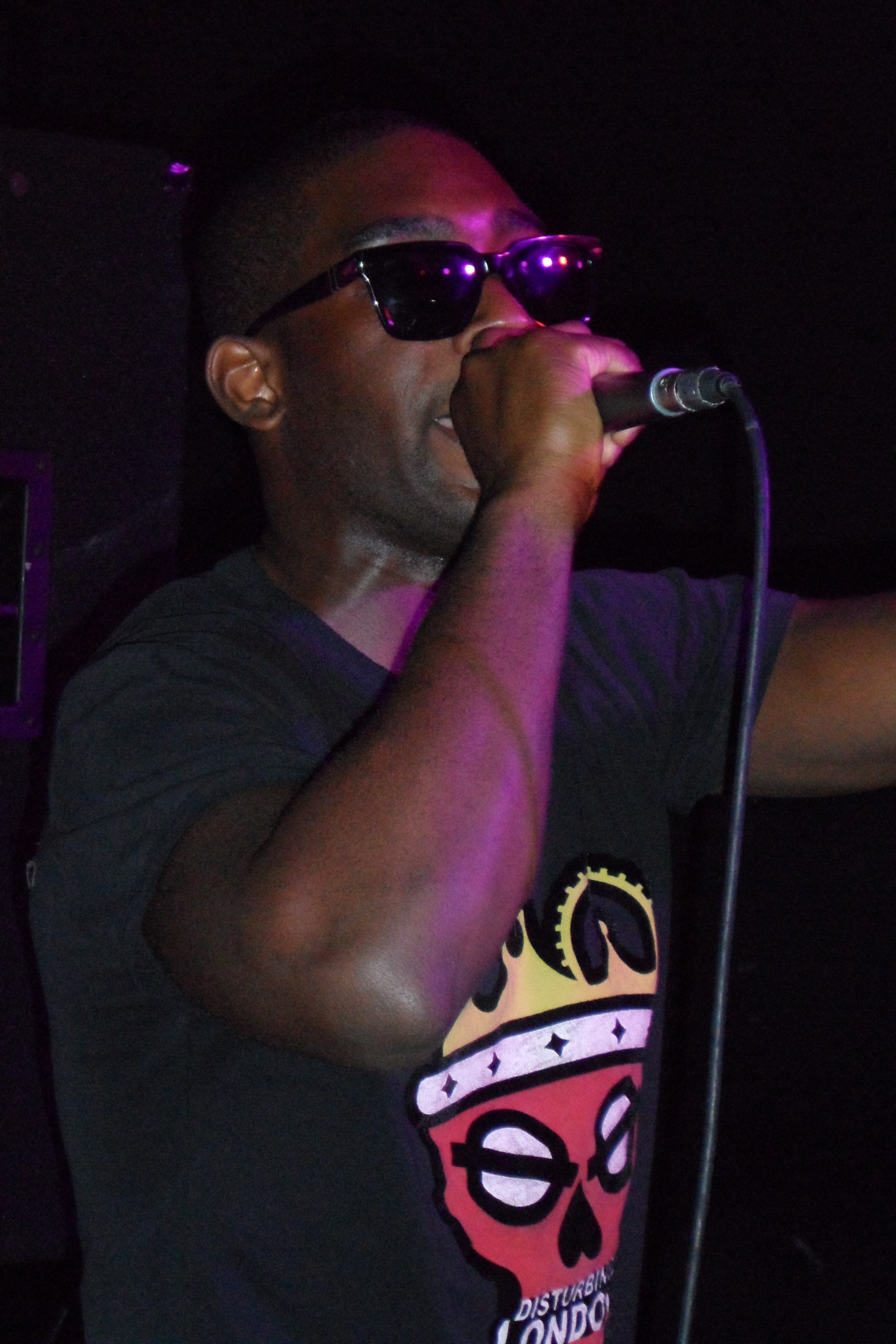
British hip hop artist Tinie Tempah originally approached Lewis to record "Trouble".

British hip hop artist Tinie Tempah approached Lewis to record a duet with him called "Trouble", however after hearing the raw demo sung by Emeli Sandé, Lewis decided she wanted the song for her own album. Together with Sandé and Fraser T Smith, Lewis recorded the song. "Trouble" appears on the album in two versions; the first features just Lewis and is the opening track on the album, while the second version featuring a rap from Childish Gambino appears as track thirteen. As a result of recording "Trouble", Sandé and Lewis struck up a friendship which led to the duo writing several other songs for the album. "Mountains" was co-written by Lewis and Sandé with Shahid Khan, James Murray, Mustafa Omer and Luke Juby. The piano and strings-led ballad was supposed to feature on Glassheart however for unknown reasons the song was reclaimed by Sandé and instead features on her own debut album Our Version of Events (2012). A small unfinished snippet of Lewis' version of "Mountains" leaked online on 15 August 2012 along with another song called "I Miss You Missing Me", which was written by Grammy-winning songwriter Diane Warren and originally sung by Chinese singer Bibi Zhou in 2010. A third Sandé and Lewis-penned song called "I to You" did make the album. In September 2011, Sylvia Patterson of The Guardian previewed several tracks including "Sugar" and "Trouble", both of which feature on the album, in addition to the song "Blank Page", which was written by Australian singer-songwriter Sia. The latter was described as "a soaring reverie over mournful piano and strings", but it did not make the album. "Blank Page" was later revealed to have been given to American singer Christina Aguilera, as it can be found on her 2012 album Lotus. During this same time period, fellow American producer Brian Kennedy Seals revealed that Lewis would record his song "Open Up".

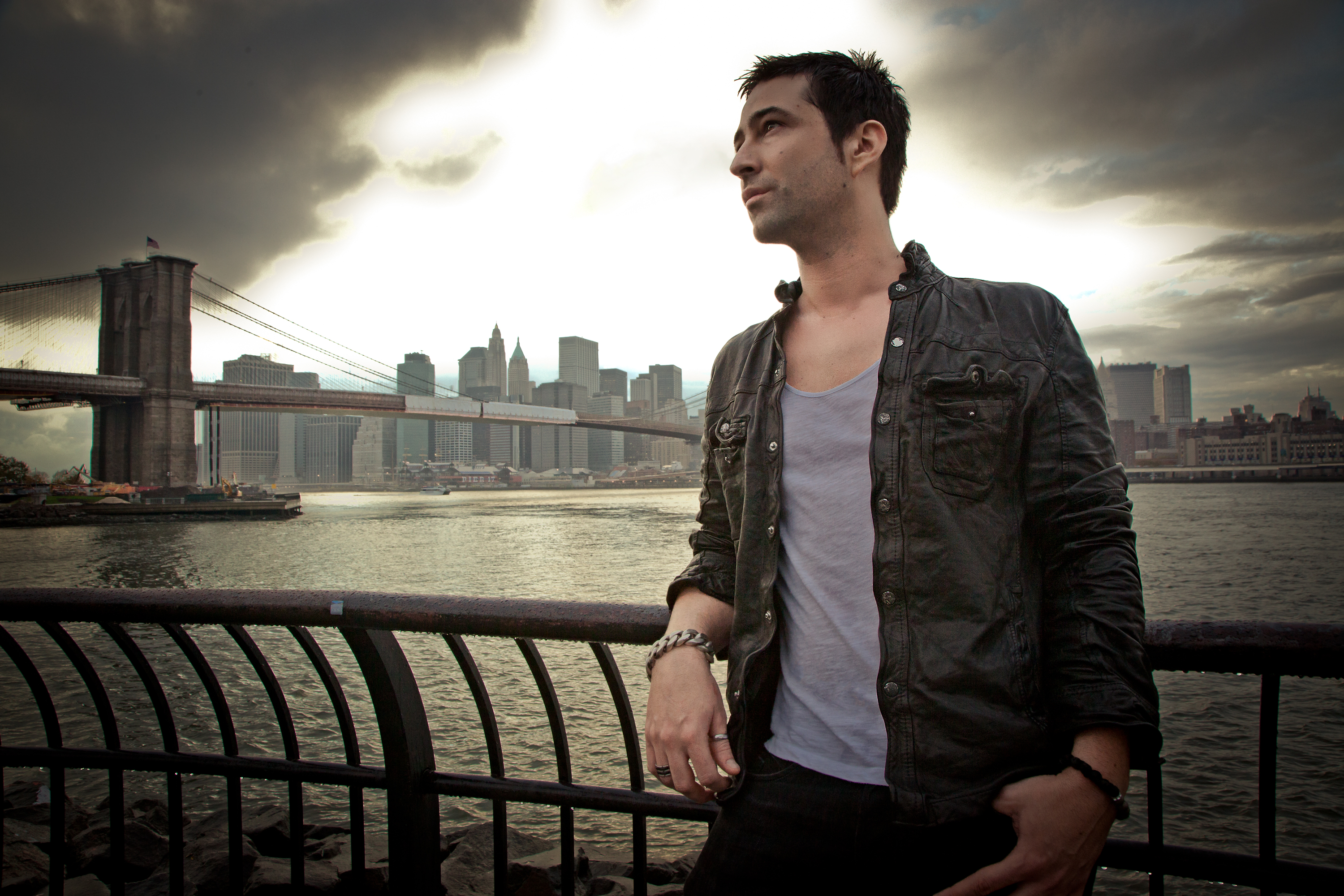
Sandy Vee produced the album's first single "Collide".

According to Yahoo! music, Lewis worked with Ammo and Steve Robson while a press release from Sony Music revealed that Lewis had branched out to work with a variety of international producers, including Swedish producer Jonas Quant, American producer Chuck Harmony and American songwriters Claude Kelly and Al Shux. During this same time, two other American record producers linked themselves to Glassheart. Whilst working as a mentor on American Idol, American music producer Christopher "Tricky" Stewart noted that he had been asked to submit material for Lewis' new album. Digital Spy and Popjustice confirmed that Lewis spent time in the studios with producer and writer Rodney "Darkchild" Jerkins", rapper will.i.am and Polow da Don. Lewis' sessions with Darkchild took place over the weekend of 18–19 May 2012 and produced the song "Shake You Up". Circle House Studios in Miami, Florida was the venue for recording sessions with American songwriter Rico Love.

MTV revealed that R&B singer-songwriter Ne-Yo was planning to pen some material for her. It would be their third collaboration, Ne-Yo having previous penned tracks for Spirit and produced tracks for Echo that did not make the final list. Ne-Yo wasn't Lewi's only returning collaborator. Andrea Martin, who co-wrote Lewis' 2008 single "Better in Time", worked with Lewis in the first half of 2011. On 1 January 2012 the leaking of a snippet of "Love Birds" (later renamed "Lovebird") revealed that according to Idolator, Lewis had worked with Bonnie McKee who is known for working with Kesha, Britney Spears and Katy Perry. Lewis also travelled to Nashville, Tennessee in January to record for a week and separately worked with Dallas Austin. McKee later joined studio sessions after Fraser T Smith co-wrote "Un Love Me" with Smith and Kelly Sheehan, a writer known for her work with Mariah Carey.

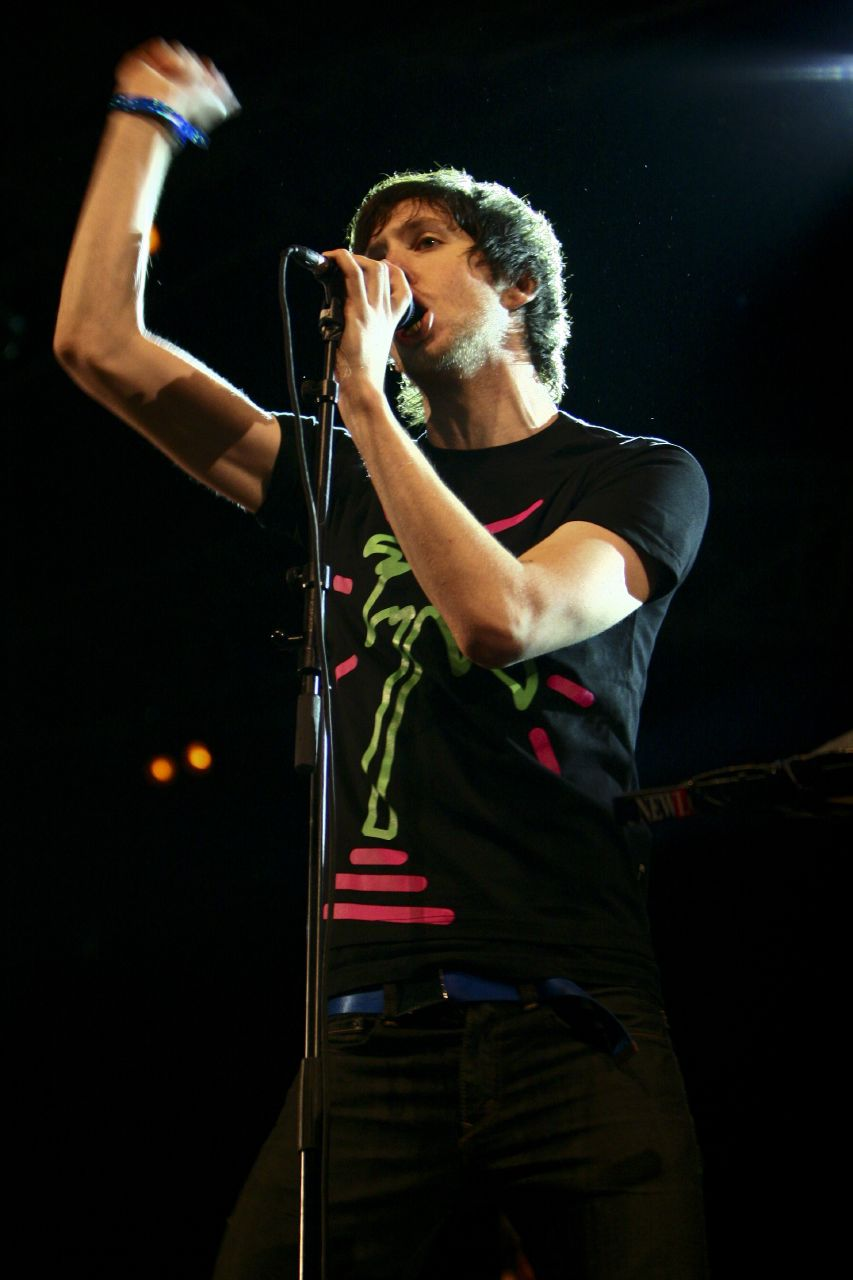
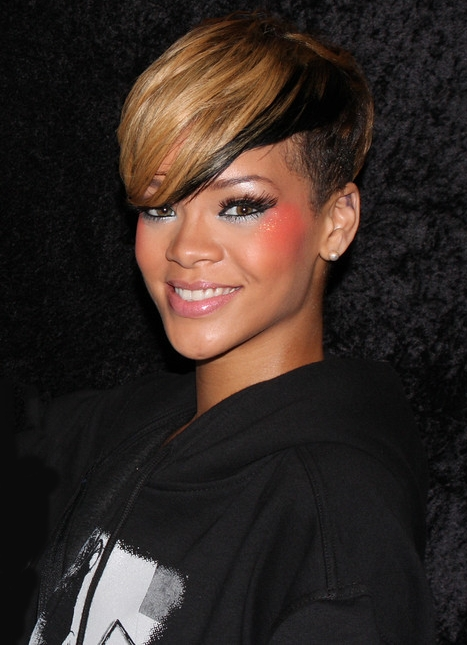
Calvin Harris (left) worked with Lewis to record, "We Found Love" but eventually the record would be released by Rihanna (right).

At the end of 2011, Lewis spoke about another of her collaborators – this time Scottish DJ Calvin Harris, "I've worked with Calvin on a song and want to do another – he's so talented. I'm planning an EP before the end of the year as I feel bad for everyone who was expecting the album this year. But the lead song won't be the track I've done with Emeli Sandé – that's for the album." Lewis revealed that she had recorded the song "We Found Love" but because she wanted to release "Trouble" as her first single, Harris subsequently offered the song to Rihanna while touring with her. Rihanna's version of "We Found Love" became a worldwide hit. Lewis released Hurt: The EP in December 2011. The EP consisted of cover songs that had been re-tooled by Smith. During the middle of March, Lewis posted a picture of herself in the studio with Jahlil Beats and Smith, confirming that Smith was now producing material for Glassheart. Later following Lewis' performance at the Radio 1 Hackney Weekend in June, it was confirmed that Smith was overseeing production for the remainder of the album and was the project's executive producer. Norwegian songwriter Ina Wroldsen joined some of Lewis and Smith's studio sessions, notably contributing to the song "Come Alive". Orchestral collective the Wired Strings joined Smith in the studio in June 2012, to record the strings section for the song "I to You". Smith produced the composition while Rosie Danvers handled the arrangement.

== Musical styles and composition ==
Lewis unveiled the official track listing of the standard edition of Glassheart on 9 September, which excluded the first single "Collide" (with Avicii), although the track did appear on the deluxe edition. The album was executive produced by Fraser T Smith, who confirmed in June 2012 that he was "taking a production role for the whole album as well as co-authoring about half its tracks". Syco Music's MD and A&R representative Sonny Thkrar said that Smith was brought to "weave a creative thread through the album", elaborating that Smith was ensuring that there was continuity in "the vocal recording, the style, the production and songwriting." Smith also commented that his aim was for "Lewis to make an artist album rather than it being a collection of songs." According to Lewis, Glassheart tells the story of "star-crossed lovers that can't be together."

=== Influence and sound ===
In February 2011, Lewis said the album would be more "experimental" than Spirit and Echo, embodying a "different" yet "classic" sound. She added, "I'm really, really excited about it. I'm working with some new producers, some up and coming people and it's going to be kind of a different sound – but still classic". Lewis suggested the album would be "a bit different from what people have heard" from her before, adding that she planned to "go in and create and just see what happens". Lewis later described the album as "more progressive", "more eclectic", "more uptempo" and "a bit darker". The song "Come Alive" experiments with dubstep and drum and bass. Lewis stated that the song was inspired by the "dirty and heavy" music sound of British electronica band Faithless. She also commented, "We wanted to do an uptempo song, but for it to remain true to what I do". In March 2012, after extending the album's recording sessions, Lewis elaborated on the evolution of her sound, "I've got a track that's got a bit of drum 'n' bass at the end. It's quite different to what I've had out before." Lewis then went on to add "I've got a track that's very '90s. It's just different influences that I've had through my life growing up. I'm really actually looking forward to people hearing it."

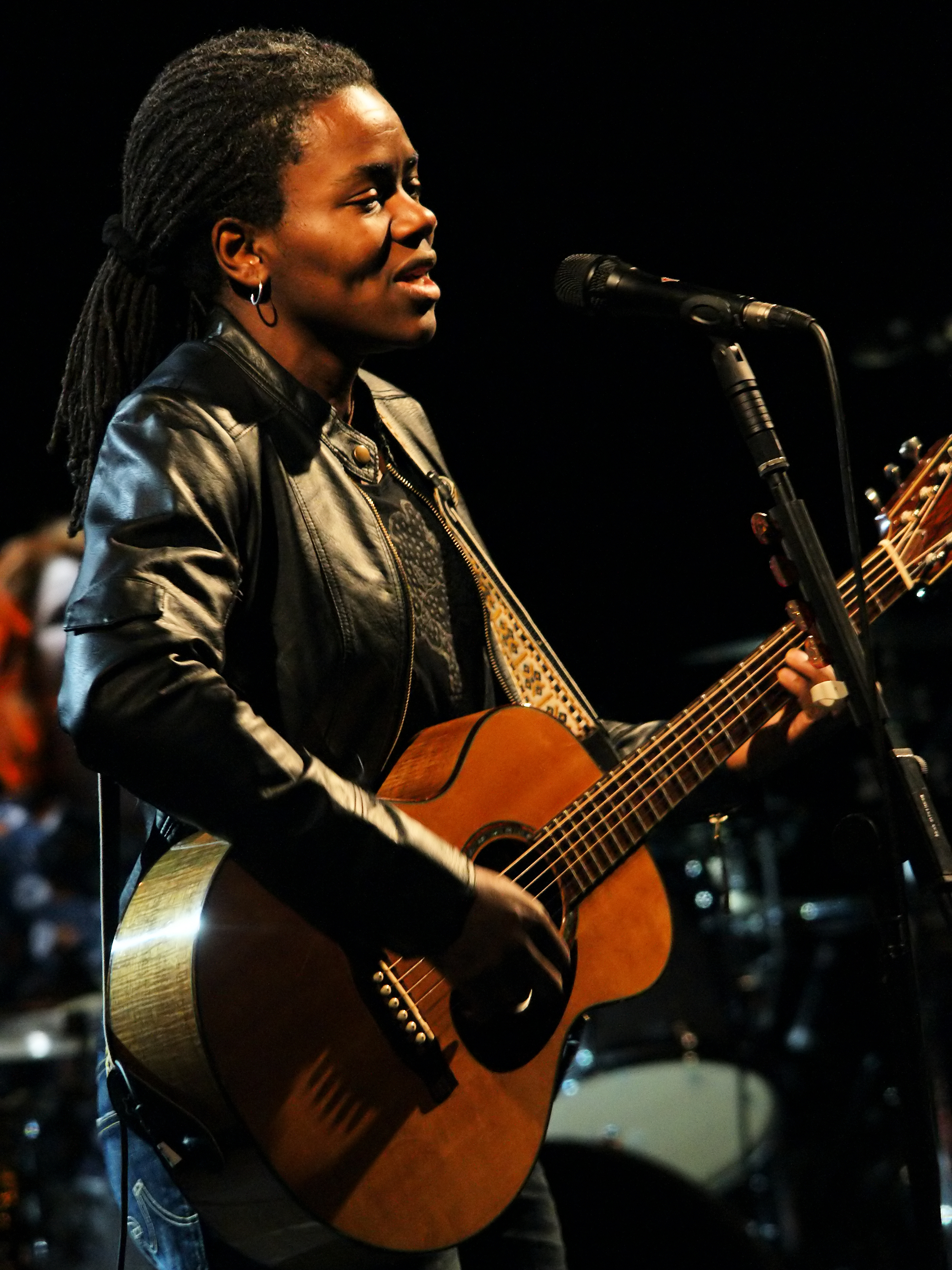
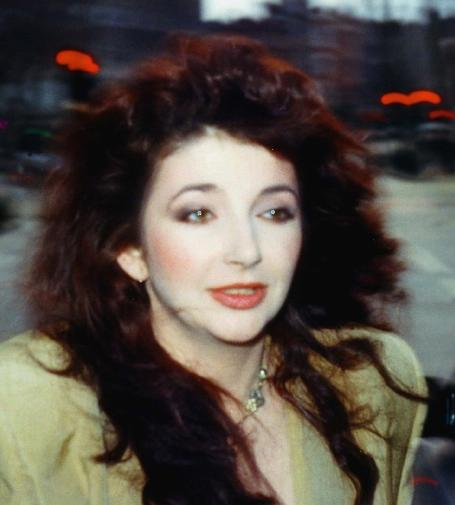
Tracy Chapman (left), Kate Bush (right) were Lewis' main influences whilst recording the album.

Throughout the development of the album Lewis explained that she wanted to make an album that is "timeless". In June 2011, when asked about the upcoming album, Lewis described it as "energetic, deep, [and] unique". She also commented that it would have a darker tone and that she would be putting her "heart into [her] lyrics". She cited Tracy Chapman, Kate Bush and Tears for Fears as the album's primary influences. Lewis spoke on the sound of the album saying "Well, when I was on tour, we mixed a lot of dancer beats on it – my cousin actually reproduced a lot of the ballads. I've taken more of that sound into the album; we've got a lot of piano and live instrumentation. I've a song called 'Fireflies' which I really, really love and hope we get to do as a single. it's a really good one. And it's got a guy on it!" She explained "So the album is such an eclectic mix. I've really got to delve into every kind of music that I love, really try everything and make the best of everything. Because I love so many different genres, it's kind of hard to just pick one thing to do, so I just did everything!"

During an interview with Digital Spy, Tedder said he was inspired by the movie Tron: Legacy among other things and "wanted to surprise and shock people". On the songs, Lewis said that Tedder "used these synthetic melodies that go up and down the scale, really, really fast." During a uStream chat with fans, Lewis announced she would be rapping on the album after "discovering a voice for rap", comparing her London MC style to American hip-hop rapper/singer Nicki Minaj. Following Smith's arrival, Lewis confirmed that the album was a mixture of "programmed synths and live music". Smith described the album vocals as "fantastic", commenting to Digital Spy that Lewis "is making a very relevant record...[it is] a very important record for her. The songs are really strong". In a separate interview with Popjustice in July 2012, Smith said that Lewis had "turned up raw emotions" and produced a "classic sound". In June 2012, following her performance of the song "Come Alive" at Radio 1's Big Weekend, Lewis was asked if "Come Alive" was a good indication of the rest of the album. She replied, "It's definitely a piece of it, but there's much more quiet-sounding instrumentals." During a September interview for the Birmingham Mail, Lewis elaborated that she was influenced by Canadian rapper Drake's "laidback beats", whilst explaining that the majority of the album is a mixture of electronic instruments and live instruments.

=== Songs and lyrics ===
Lewis unveiled the official track listing of the standard edition of Glassheart on 9 September 2012, which excluded the first single "Collide" (with Avicii). A two-disc deluxe edition was also released alongside the standard version featuring several bonus tracks. The album was executively produced by Fraser T Smith, who confirmed in June 2012 that he was "taking a production role for the whole album as well as co-authoring about half its tracks". Syco Music's MD and A&R representative Sonny Thkrar said that Smith was brought on board to "weave a creative thread through the album", elaborating that Smith was ensuring that there was continuity in "the vocal recording, the style, the production and songwriting." Smith also commented that his aim was for "Lewis to make an artist album rather than it being a collection of songs." According to Lewis, Glassheart tells the story of "star-crossed lovers that can't be together."

Leona Lewis – Trouble (feat. Childish Gambino)
A 21 second sample of "Trouble" featuring Gambino's middle eight verse, as the rap fades into Lewis' final chorus. Lewis sings of a love that has become destructive with the lyrics "I told you never to get used to me."

The album opens and closes with two versions of the lead single, "Trouble", described by Sylvia Patterson of The Guardian as "very London". Co-written with Sandé, it contains elements of trip hop and was inspired by Lewis' 2010 break-up with childhood sweetheart Lou Al-Chamaa. Lyrics co-written by Lewis include the lines "I told you never to get used to me, I stay awake while you fall asleep. I'm a whole lot of trouble, we're in a whole lot of trouble. You shout louder than you used to and you hold on tighter in the bedroom." When Smith was brought on board, "Trouble" was one of the songs he worked on; a new rap verse by Childish Gambino was added along with some additional production. Early critics praised the song's emotive qualities and dark undertones.

"Un Love Me", a song described by Smith as "radio friendly" and "a classic Leona Lewis record", appears as the second track. It was written by Smith, Bonnie McKee and Kelly Sheehan; McKee's previous credits include songs for Katy Perry and Britney Spears, while Sheehan is most noted for collaborating with Mariah Carey. Upon reviewing the album, critics also praised its cridentials as a single. It is built around guitar riffs and "thudding bass beats" while vocals are in falsetto. Critics compared the song to work by Indie band Snow Patrol. "Lovebird" is a midtempo ballad which uses an organ-based introduction, similar to that used in Lewis's debut single "Bleeding Love", and is then layered with piano melodies in the chorus which critics compared to those used in Lewis's single "Better in Time". An up-tempo dubstep and drum and bass-inspired song, "Come Alive" written and produced by Smith with co-writing from Lewis and Swedish songwriter Ina Wroldsen features as the fourth song. Lewis commented that the song had a dark tone and energy. Critics noted the song's heavy electronic production which includes a techno breakdown towards the end.

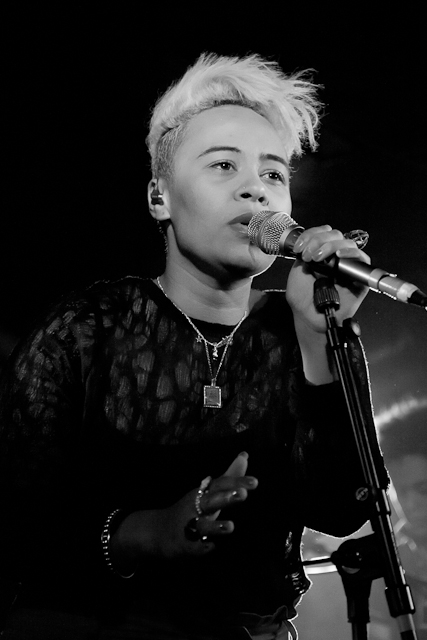
As well as co-writing "Trouble", Sandé helped to write "I to You".

"Fireflies" was written and produced by Cragie Dodds from indie-rock outfit One Eskimo. The track opens with a "rotating piano riff" while during the verses and choruses Lewis' vocals are joined by a strings orchestra, all of which critics noted while pointing to the strong gospel influences. "I to You" is another song written by Sandé and produced by Loco. It is driven by a string instrument-led melody, which was performed by the orchestral collective Wired Strings and arranged by Rosie Danvers. "Shake You Up", was noted by critics as a "modern remake" of an '80s pop song with strong elements of bubblegum pop. It was written by Rodney "Darkchild" Jerkins and British singer-songwriter Olivia Waithe (also known as Livvi Franc). Critics noted that "Shake You Up" starts with a vocal interlude from Lewis, who asks "Can you turn the music up a little bit please?" The production, helmed by Darkchild, uses synths and a midtempo "80's pop" melody. Critics compared it to the early work of the late American entertainer Whitney Houston. "Stop the Clocks" returns to the electronic production present on much of the album, but according to critics it was a "lighter instrumental production" that could have been taken from Lewis' last album Echo (2009).

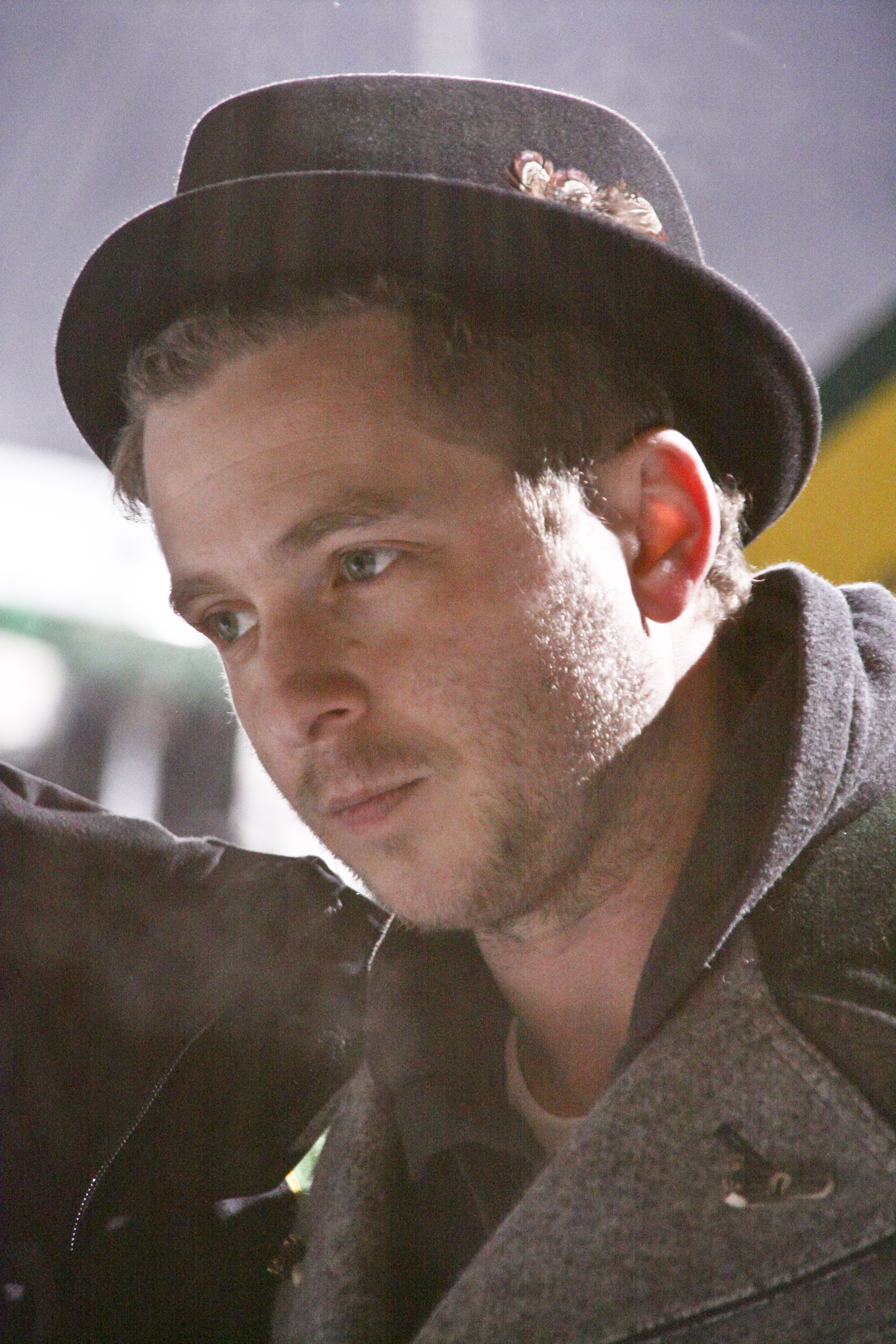
Tedder produced previous singles "Bleeding Love" and "Happy".

"Favourite Scar" was co-written by Lewis, Tedder, Noel Zancanlla, Roland Orzabal and Curt Smith. It is built around the lyric "You shot me through my heart. Pain never felt so good. Boy, you're my favourite scar," whilst critics noted that it was full of attitude from the beginning, comparing it to songs by Barbadian singer Rihanna. The song is built around a sample of the piano riff from the Tears for Fears song "Head Over Heels", which is joined by hip hop beats; Lewis Corner from Digital Spy said "it's not the kind of Ryan Tedder collaboration we've come to expect from LeLe." "When it Hurts" is a piano-led ballad that also features some elements of electronic guitar. The album's title song "Glassheart" is also a production done by Tedder. Critics noted that "Glassheart" was a distinctive change in sound for Lewis, with its production featuring elements of dance, grime and dubstep. Critics noted that after several ballads, the up-tempo "Glassheart" was a "welcome change of pace".

The album closes with a "down-tempo ballad" called "Fingerprint", which was written by Lewis, Laura Pergolizzi and Smith, Critics noted that the song was a showcase for Lewis' vocals; Lewis begins the song singing in her lower register before moving to her falsetto. The song is produced atop a "delicate piano riff" which are later joined by "crashing echoes" and "strings" section. The chorus is built around the lyric "No match, no match, no match for your fingerprint/ No substitute, no other you." A rap edit of "Trouble" which features Childish Gambino is also included as a bonus track; Gambino raps a "witty and poetic verse" during the song's middle eight section.

The deluxe edition features six additional tracks which on CD versions of the album, feature on a second disc. The first three songs are acoustic performances of "Trouble", "Come Alive" and "Glassheart". Tracks four and five are not present on the standard edition. "Colorblind" is song number four, while "Sugar" is a song that Patterson described as "an orchestral landscape". "Sugar" was written by Sandé and Al Shux. The second disc closes with the Afrojack remix of "Collide".

== Title and artwork ==
The album title "Glassheart" was inspired by a conversation that Lewis had with Tedder. During the conversation Tedder asked Lewis about her past experiences with love and life in general. Lewis' response led him to the word "Glassheart". During an interview with Clyde 1 radio, Lewis said "Glassheart represents protecting your heart, yourself and protecting your emotions, its very poignant".

The artwork and visuals for the album were shot with American fashion photography Guy Aroch in a vintage apartment. Glassheart's album cover was unveiled on 5 September 2011. An editor for The Metro described the cover photo. Lewis stares directly at the camera "in a continuation of the more sexy and sophisticated look she has been sporting in recent months." The reviewer commented on Lewis' styling: "Her long dark hair is swept back from her face, aside from her ruffled fringe, while two black stars have been carefully applied below her eyes, adding to the overall dramatic effect." Becky Bain from music website Idolator, commented that although "Lewis looks beautiful", the image processing makes her look "incredibly washed out in this over-saturated photo"; Bain was less impressed with the star-like beauty marks on her face. A competition run by Lewis' website gave fans the opportunity to be part of the artwork for the deluxe edition of the album. Fans were asked to send in pictures of themselves posing with a heart, for inclusion in the album liner booklet. Additionally, Lewis hand-signed 3,000 limited edition copies of the album which exclusively went on sale through online retailer Play.com, while retailer HMV sold the album with an exclusive slipcase.

== Promotion ==
=== Marketing ===
On 23 July 2012 Lewis released her first video prior to the album release, saying "In the lead-up to my album, I wanted to make some video blogs and share with you my journey (!) and everything that goes on, from the video I'm doing very soon, to going on the road doing shows. Every week I'm going to be doing a little video blog and this is the first one." A second blog entry on 10 August, showed Lewis heading to the studio to record acoustic performances of the album's songs. Later, another blog revealed that five songs had been recorded with the backing provided solely by piano and cello. The first of those acoustic performances was for the album's lead single, "Trouble" featuring Gambino. A newsletter to fans on 24 August 2012 mentioned the "Trouble" release and officially revealed details about a competition for aspiring musicians. In association with TalentHouse, fans had the opportunity to compete for the chance to have Lewis' website release their remix. Lewis and Smith would be among the judges.

Additionally, a separate competition gave fans the opportunity to appear in the album's deluxe edition artwork. Fans were encouraged to send in pictures of themselves interacting with a heart (or hearts), from which images would be used for the deluxe edition cover. During a promotional tour of UK radio stations, Lewis premiered the album's title track on 19 September 2012, on Capital FM's In Demand program. Two days later, Lewis premiered "Stop the Clocks" live on Graham Norton's Saturday morning radio show on BBC Radio 2. On 26 September 2012, Gene Simmons' daughter Sophie Tweed-Simmons auditioned for the second season of The X Factor USA; during the judges comments on the performance, a snippet of "Fireflies" played in the background. From 28 September 2012 through to 15 October 2012, an acoustic version of "Colorblind" is available as a free download from Amazon.co.uk. "Colorblind" was originally performed by American rock band Counting Crows; Lewis covered the song for her 2011 release, Hurt: The EP and that version is also featured on the deluxe edition of Glassheart.

=== Live performances ===
On 3 September 2011 Lewis performed "Collide" for the first time on the first episode of Simon Cowell's new gameshow Red or Black?. She then performed the song along with "Glassheart" at London's G-A-Y nightclub. Then in June 2012, Lewis performed at BBC Radio One's Hackney Weekend. Lewis' performance was directed by Steve Anderson and was choreographed by Lewis' then-boyfriend Dennis Jauch. The set-list consisted of Skylar Grey's interpretation of "I'm Coming Home" (with special guest Wretch 32), a mash-up of previous single "Better in Time" with Rihanna's "Man Down", as well as "Come Alive", "Collide" and "Run". A remix of "Collide" produced by Anderson was commissioned for the performance, while the Hackney Empire Community Gospel Choir joined in on "Run".

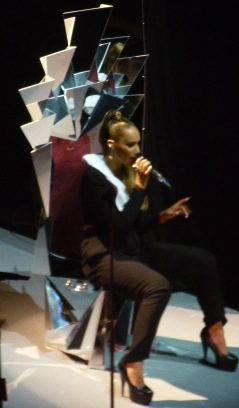
Lewis performing "I to You" at the Royal Albert Hall on 9 May 2013

She reprised her performance of "Come Alive" during an acoustic set at the Amberliegh Charity Foundation Event on 25 August 2012. The set also included previous singles "Run", "Bleeding Love" and "Better in Time", in addition to covers of "Apologize" by OneRepublic and "Grenade" by Bruno Mars. On 11 September 2012, Lewis held an acoustic gig for an intimate crowd at London's Annabel Nightclub. The set-list included songs from Glassheart. Lewis performed "Trouble" live on the ninth series of The X Factor, the same show that launched her career seven years earlier. She performed on the weekend of 6 & 7 October, directly preceding the song's release. During album release week, Lewis performed on Alan Carr: Chatty Man on 12 September before returning to London's G-A-Y nightclub, almost a year after she appeared at G-A-Y to perform "Glassheart" and "Collide". Lewis' set was supported by the first-eliminated act (Carolynne Poole) from the ninth series. Lewis performed an acoustic version of "Come Alive" on 7 October for The Xtra Factor. In November, Lewis uploaded the studio recording of her "Come Alive" acoustic performance which was included on the deluxe edition of Glassheart to her Vevo page. On 20 October 2012, Lewis performed an acoustic set for the seventh annual Cosmopolitan Ultimate Women Awards.

== Singles ==
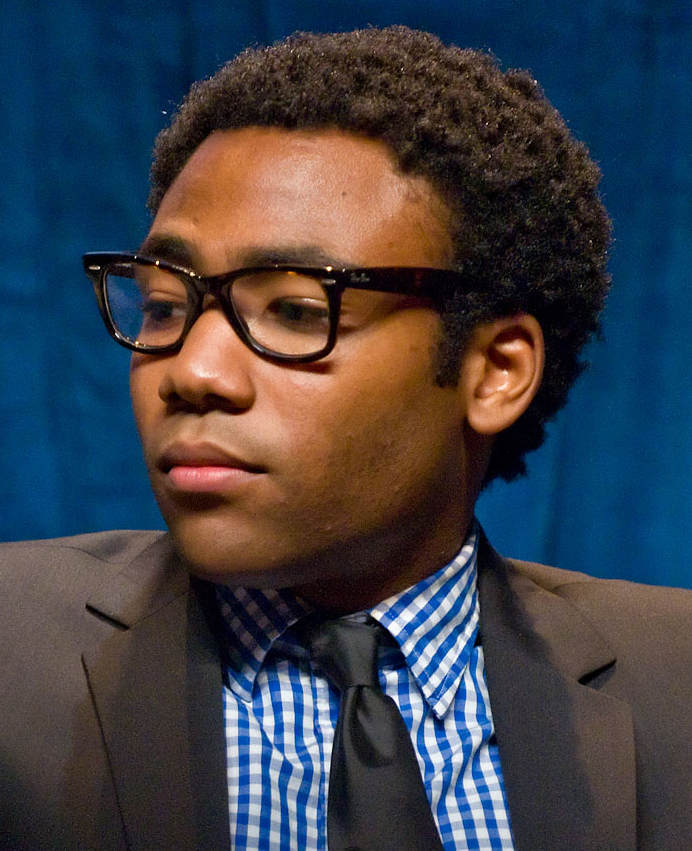
Childish Gambino — the American actor, comedian and rapper features on lead single "Trouble".

On 14 July 2011, "Collide" was unveiled on BBC Radio 1's The Scott Mills Show as Lewis' first single from Glassheart. The Autumn Rowe-penned dance-pop song quickly attracted controversy after it was claimed to have plagiarised a sample of Simon Jeffes' "Perpetuum Mobile", exactly the same sample used to create the melody for Swedish disc jockey (DJ) Avicii's 2010 song "Penguin". To resolve the court proceedings filed by Avicii, the single on 4 September 2011 as a joint collaboration between Lewis and Avicii. Music critics had a mixed reception to the song, torn between the Lewis's ability to "deliver power ballad lyrics into a dance orientated song" and song's production which "seemed to build and drop at the wrong times". Commercially, "Collide" was reasonably successful becoming Lewis' first number on the US Billboard Hot Dance Club Songs chart. In Ireland and the United Kingdom, "Collide" debuted and peaked at number three and four respectively. The Afrojack remix of "Collide" is included on the bonus disc of the deluxe edition of Glassheart; the original single version is excluded from all editions of the album.

Following a year of delays, Lewis followed up "Collide" with a new version of the song "Trouble", a song that was always intended as the album's next single. The new version featuring American entertainer Childish Gambino premiered on 21 August 2012 and superseded "Collide" as the album's lead single. It was released in Ireland on 5 October and in the UK on 7 October. Critics praised the song's production, Gambino's feature rap and Lewis' powerful vocals. Upon release, "Trouble" had mixed success reaching number seven on the UK Singles Chart, eight in Scotland and top-thirty Germany. Near the end of October, Lewis said that the ballad "Fireflies" had been selected to release next because it would be "really powerful" in the run-up to Christmas. On 26 October an official lyric video was published on Lewis' official VEVO account. However, on 5 November 2012, at the London Oxford Street Christmas light event, Lewis introduced "Lovebird" as her new single and before performing the song live for the first time. The single was released from 16 November 2012, serving as the first single for much of Europe, while it received a limited "impact day" release in the UK on 9 December 2012. It sold fewer than 600 copies in the UK, becoming Lewis' first single to not chart in the UK, as well as her lowest-selling release in that territory. Elsewhere in South Korea, "Lovebird" peaked at number twenty-two on the South Korean International Singles Chart.

== Glassheart Tour ==
In 2013, Lewis embarked on her second headline tour titled "Glassheart Tour", visiting twenty-one venues across Germany and the United Kingdom. The tour began on 15 April in Berlin. The list expanded from an initial sixteen to include five dates in Germany. Lewis then proceeded with UK dates beginning in Glasgow, including two dates at London's Royal Albert Hall before finishing on 18 May in Plymouth. During an interview with Digital Spy, Lewis told Tom Eames that Glassheart has a running theme about "star-crossed lovers that can't be together", and so it was likely that this idea would feature on the tour. Lewis also cited William Shakespeare as another source of inspiration.

== Critical reception ==
Professional ratings
Aggregate scores
Source	Rating
Metacritic	60/100
Review scores
Source	Rating
AllMusic	3/5 stars
BBC Music	mixed
Daily Mirror	4/5 stars
Digital Spy	5/5 stars
Evening Standard	3/5 stars
Financial Times	4/5 stars
The Guardian	3/5 stars
The Independent	3/5 stars
The Observer	3/5 stars
Virgin Media	3/5 stars

Glassheart received mixed reviews from critics. It received praise for the decisions to experiment with dubstep, bubblegum pop and electronic music on some of the tracks and criticism towards the ballads, with critics divided over the number on one album and their quality versus the more up-tempo songs. Ludovic Hunter-Tilney from the Financial Times found that although there was still a "preponderance of Adele-aping break-up songs", the delays in releasing Glassheart had worked in Lewis' favour by forcing her to "confront her lack of [musical] direction". Hunter-Tilney praised both the Mariah Carey-styled vocals and use of "echoing snare drums" in many of the songs, concluding that Lewis' singing "has an extra edge to it" while the music "strays out of her comfort zone". The Daily Mirror's Dean Piper also noted similarities to Adele, commenting that although both Lewis and Adele had worked with Smith, Lewis' album would "not translate to a universal audience" like Adele's 21 had. However Piper did call the comparison unfair because Glassheart "reminds you what an extraordinary talent Leona is", also saying "there's no doubting the music is good and Glassheart does appear to be her most personal album to date." Amongst the songs Piper picked out were "Un Love Me", "Favourite Scar" and "Fingerprint". Another positive review came from Digital Spy's Lewis Corner who said that Lewis surprised on "the pacey numbers full of angst and torment that standout". Commending her falsetto, Corner awarded Lewis five out of five stars and ended by saying "Like many artists before her, Leona has channelled the darker side of love's grasp into her work – and the result is nothing short of spectacular."

Matthew Horton writing for Virgin Media praised Lewis for experimenting with dubstep on "Come Alive" and bubblegum pop on "Shake You Up", describing both songs as experiments that work. Caroline Sullivan from The Guardian newspaper picked up on the album's composition and described it as too heavily reliant on ballads, saying the issue was that it was "an area where Adele now has the advantage." However Sullivan did say that "for once Lewis has made an album that's worth turning up – in parts, at least." She praised "Come Alive", "Glassheart" and "Trouble". Fraser McAlpine from BBC Music gave the album a mixed review saying that Glassheart "largely plays up to expectations". He criticised the subject matter, noting that many of the songs revisit familiar territory on how "she is always unlucky in love, unless she is swooning in melancholy bliss." McAlpine praised the production values, noting that "over the course of these 12 songs there are all sorts of production nods to happier music" but also pointing out that on most songs "[Lewis] sounds devastated." In part "it's her natural tone of voice", McAlpine concluded, as well as noting that there were not really any up-tempo songs, just songs that were not ballads, but adding that it did not matter as "the songs that tend to fly best, on their own terms at least, are the uncluttered muscle ballads." Commenting on "Come Alive", he stated that although the "breakbeat" production is one of the "happier" ones on the album, Lewis sounds "eternally downcast". The Independent's Hugh Montgomery gave the album a mixed review, saying that "obviously there's still swathes of antiseptic balladry best described as 'music to fold towels by'." However, not all of his review was negative. Montgomery said the album attempted to make Lewis "current again" by including songs penned by Sandé, a "Bond theme manqué" and "obviously and actually rather effectively, some dubstep". Critics Robert Copsey and Lewis Corner from Digital Spy put Glassheart at number nine in their top 20 albums of 2012, writing that despite being renowned for ballads, "it's the pacey numbers full of angst and torment that stand out." Later in a poll of 25,000 people, conducted by Digital Spy, readers voted Glassheart the fifth best album of 2012 with 9.8% share of the vote, behind Sandé's Our Version of Events, Babel by Mumford and Sons, Lana Del Rey's Born to Die and Fall to Grace by Paloma Faith.

== Commercial performance ==
According to mid-week predictions from the Official Charts Company, Glassheart was expected to chart at number two on the UK Albums Chart, 4,000 copies behind the week's biggest seller, 18-year-old Nottingham singer-songwriter Jake Bugg's self-titled debut album. Upon the release of the final chart, Glassheart debuted at number three with 27,000 copies sold, 8,000 copies behind that week's number one, Bugg's self-titled debut album and 1,000 copies behind Mumford & Sons' second album Babel. Glassheart thus became Lewis' first album not to debut at number one. Its first week sales represent a stark decline from Spirit (2007), which opened with 375,000 copies and the 161,000 copies that Echo (2009) sold in its first week On the UK Download Chart, Glassheart fared better, debuting at number two, having beaten Babel, but losing out to Bugg's debut album.

In Scotland, the album also debuted at number three. Meanwhile, on the Irish Albums Chart, Glassheart debuted at number four, becoming Lewis' third top-five peaking album in Ireland behind 2007's Spirit (peaked at number one) and 2009's Echo (peaked at number two). In continental Europe, Glassheart was also considerably less successful than Lewis' previous releases. It debuted at number twenty-nine in Switzerland, spending two weeks in the top-fifty on the Swiss Albums Chart. Additionally in Spain, Glassheart opened at number fifty-four, whereas Echo peaked in the top-twenty and Spirit peaked in the top-thirty. Glassheart was most successful in Austria and Germany where it peaked at number five and six, respectively. In Austria it became Lewis' second top-five album, besting Echo's peak of number eight but losing out to Spirit which peaked at number one. Similarly in Germany, the album became Lewis' second top-ten album, after Spirit reached number one and Echo peaked at number twelve.

In South Korea, Glassheart peaked at number 13. Within the four-week period of the album charted, both "Trouble" and "Lovebird" entered the international singles chart. South Korea was the only country in which "Lovebird" charted, where it experienced strong download sales. The total number of downloads between the two singles was 36,980. In total, the album shifted over 20,000 copies in the four weeks it remained on the chart.

== Track listing ==
Standard edition (disc 1)
No.	Title	Writer(s)	Producer(s)	Length
1.	"Trouble"	Shahid Khan; Emeli Sandé; Harry Craze; Hugo Chegwin; Fraser T Smith; Leona Lewis; James Murray; Mustafa Omer	Smith; Naughty Boy; Chris Loco^{[a]}; Orlando "Jahlil Beats" Tucker^{[b]}	3:41
2.	"Un Love Me"	Smith; Bonnie McKee; Kelly Sheehan; Lewis	Smith; Chris Loco	4:12
3.	"Lovebird"	McKee; Joshua Coleman; Lukasz Gottwald	Josh Abraham; Oligee; Ammo	3:32
4.	"Come Alive"	Smith; Ina Wroldsen	Smith; Chris Loco; Tim Deluxe^{[b]}	4:03
5.	"Fireflies"	Craigie Dodds	Dodds	3:55
6.	"I to You"	Christopher Crowhurst; Sandé	Smith; Chris Loco	3:18
7.	"Shake You Up"	Rodney Jerkins; Olivia Waithe; Lewis	Jerkins	3:40
8.	"Stop the Clocks"	Smith; Jörgen Elofsson; Rachel Moulden; Lewis	Smith	4:01
9.	"Favourite Scar"	Ryan Tedder; Noel Zancanella; Lewis; Roland Orzabal; Curt Smith	Tedder; Zancanella	3:36
10.	"When It Hurts"	Khan; Andrea Martin; Luke Juby	Smith; Naughty Boy	3:12
11.	"Glassheart"	Tedder; Brent Kutzle; Zancanella; Justin Franks; Fis Shkreli; Lewis; Peter Svensson	DJ Frank E; Tedder; Zancanella^{[a]}; Kutzle^{[a]}; Shrkeli^{[a]}	3:56
12.	"Fingerprint"	Smith; LP; Lewis	Smith	4:07
13.	"Trouble" (featuring Childish Gambino)	Khan; Sandé; Craze; Chegwin; Smith; Lewis; Murray; Omer; Donald Glover	Smith; Naughty Boy; Chris Loco^{[a]}; Tucker^{[b]}	3:42
Total length:				48:51

Deluxe edition (disc 2) / Digital deluxe edition bonus tracks
No.	Title	Writer(s)	Producer(s)	Length
1.	"Trouble" (Acoustic)	Khan; Sandé; Craze; Chegwin; Smith; Lewis; Murray; Omer	Smith	3:43
2.	"Come Alive" (Acoustic)	Smith; Wroldsen	Smith	4:25
3.	"Glassheart" (Acoustic)	Tedder; Kutzle; Zancanella; Franks; Shkreli; Lewis; Svensson	Tommy King; Ira Glansbeeik	3:46
4.	"Colorblind"	David Bryson; Adam Duritz; Charlie Gillingham; Mattew Malley; Ben Mize; Daniel Vickery	Smith	3:22
5.	"Sugar"	Alexander Shuckburg; Sandé	Al Shux	3:36
6.	"Collide" (Afrojack Remix) (Leona Lewis / Avicii)	Tim Berg; Simon Jeffes; Arash Pournouri; Autumn Rowe; Sandy Wilhelm	Sandy Vee; The Young Boyz^{[b]}; Afrojack^{[b]}	5:54
Total length:				24:44

iTunes Store bonus video
No.	Title	Writer(s)	Length
7.	"Glassheart" (Live Acoustic)	Tedder; Kutzle; Zancanella; Franks; Shkreli; Lewis; Svensson	3:49
Total length:			28:33

Notes

- ^{^a} signifies co-producer
- ^{^b} signifies additional producer
- "Favourite Scar" contains a sample of "Head over Heels" performed by Tears for Fears and written by Roland Orzabal & Curt Smith.
- "Collide" contains a sample of "Perpetuum Mobile" by Simon Jeffes.

== Personnel and credits ==
Adapted from album credits and album liner.

=== Recording studios ===
- Denver, Colorado – Patriot Studios
- London, UK – Air Studios, Air Edel Studios, Angel Recording Studios, The Dairy Studios, Metropolis Studios, MyAudioTonic Studios (The Matrix), The Pool
- Los Angeles, California – 2nd Floor Studios, Harmony Recording Studios, Henson Recording Studios, Side 3 Studios, Pulse Recording, Westlake Recording Studios, UMPG Studios

=== Performers ===
- Leona Lewis – lead vocals, background vocals (on 7. "Shake You Up"
- Eemia – background vocals (on 6. "I to You")
- Livvi Franc – background (on 7. "Shake You Up")
- Childish Gambino – guest vocals (on 13. "Trouble")
- Ladonna Harley Peters – background vocals (on 1. "Trouble", 2. "Un Love Me", 4. "Come Alive", 8. "Stop the Clocks", 10. "When it Hurts", 12. "Fingerprint")
- Emeli Sandé – background vocals (on 6. "I to You", disc 2 – 5. "Sugar")
- Ina Wroldsen – background vocals(on 4. "Come Alive")

=== Musicians and technicians ===
- Josh Abraham – producer
- Phil Allen – engineer
- Beatriz Artola – engineer
- Brandon N. Caddell – assistant engineer
- Smith Carlson – engineer
- Stephanie Cavey – violinist
- Matt Chamberlin – engineer
- Matt Champlin – mixing technician
- Hugo Chegwin – composer
- Joshua "Ammo" Coleman – producer
- Harry Craze – composer
- Christopher Crowhurst (Chris Loco) – drum programming, guitar, keyboards, producer, programming
- Rosie Danvers – cello, string arrangements
- Tim Deluxe – additional production
- Craigie Dodds – drums, engineer, guitar, keyboard, piano, producer, programming
- Alison Dods – violin
- Guy Farley – string arrangements, string conductor
- Justin Franks (DJ Frank E) – producer
- Fraser T. Smith – drum programming, drums, guitar, bass guitar, keyboards, percussion, piano, producer, programming
- Mike Freesh – bass, drum programming, synthesizer
- Ben Georgiadis – string engineer
- Serban Ghenea – mixing
- Alex Graupera – assistant engineer, engineer
- Matty Green – mixing assistant
- Jack Guy – engineer
- John Hanes – mixing engineer
- Helen Hawthorn – violin
- Charlie Hugall – engineer, percussion
- Sally Jackson – violin
- Bryony James – cello
- Rodney "Darkchild" Jerkins – mixing, musician, producer
- Becky Jones – viola
- Patrick Kiernan – violin
- Shahid "Naughty Boy" Khan – producer
- Brent Kutzle – producer
- Colin Leonard – mastering
- Steve Mair – double bass
- Trent Mazur – drum programming, guitar, synthesizer
- Oligee – producer
- Brent Paschke – guitar
- Kerenza Peacock – violin
- Steve Price – string engineer
- Brian Ray – guitar
- Daniela Rivera – assistant engineer, engineer
- Jenny Sacha – violin
- Phil Seaford – mixing assistant
- Sarah Sexton – violin
- Fio "Alastor" Shkreli (Fis Shkreli) – drum programming, producer
- Ash Soan – drums
- Mark "Spike" Stent – mixing
- Phil Tan – mixing
- Ryan Tedder – instrumentation, producer
- Orlando "Jalil Beats" Tucker – additional production, programming
- Seth Waldmann – engineer, vocal recording
- Bruce White – viola
- Darin "Piano Man" Whittington – drums, keyboards
- Deborah Widdup – violin
- Ryan Williams – engineer
- The Wired Strings – strings
- Noel Zancanella – instrumentation, producer

== Charts and certifications ==
=== Weekly charts ===
Chart (2012–13)	Peak position
Austrian Albums (Ö3 Austria)	5
Dutch Albums (Album Top 100)	57
German Albums (Offizielle Top 100)	6
Irish Albums (IRMA)	4
Scottish Albums (Official Charts)	3
South Korean International Albums (Gaon)	13
Spanish Albums (Promusicae)	54
Swiss Albums (Schweizer Hitparade)	29
UK Albums (Official Charts)	3

=== Year-end charts ===
Chart (2012)	Position
UK Albums (OCC)	154

=== Certifications ===
Region	Certification	Certified units/sales
United Kingdom (BPI)	Silver	60,000^{*}
^{*} Sales figures based on certification alone.

== Release history ==
Table of release dates, formats, editions and record labels
Region	Date	Format	Editions	Label
Ireland	12 October 2012	CD, digital download	Standard, Deluxe	Sony Music Entertainment
United Kingdom	15 October 2012	CD, digital download	Standard, Deluxe	Syco Music, Sony Music
Italy	5 November 2012	CD, digital download	Standard	Sony Music Entertainment
Belgium	23 November 2012	CD, digital download	Standard	Sony Music Entertainment
Netherlands	23 November 2012	CD, digital download	Standard	Sony Music Entertainment
Norway	23 November 2012	CD, digital download	Standard	Sony Music Entertainment
Switzerland	23 November 2012	CD, digital download	Standard	Sony Music Entertainment
France	26 November 2012	CD, digital download	Standard, Deluxe	Sony Music Entertainment
Spain	27 November 2012	CD, digital download	Standard, Deluxe	Sony Music Entertainment
Denmark	28 November 2012	CD, digital download	Deluxe	Sony Music Entertainment
Finland	28 November 2012	CD, digital download	Standard, Deluxe	Sony Music Entertainment
Sweden	28 November 2012	CD, digital download	Standard, Deluxe	Sony Music Entertainment
Australia	30 November 2012	CD, digital download	Standard, Deluxe	Sony Music Entertainment
Germany	11 January 2013	CD, digital download	Deluxe	Sony Music Entertainment
Portugal	28 January 2013	CD, digital download	Standard, Deluxe	Sony Music Entertainment
United States		Digital download, streaming	Deluxe	Sony Music Entertainment
