= List of songs recorded by Leona Lewis =

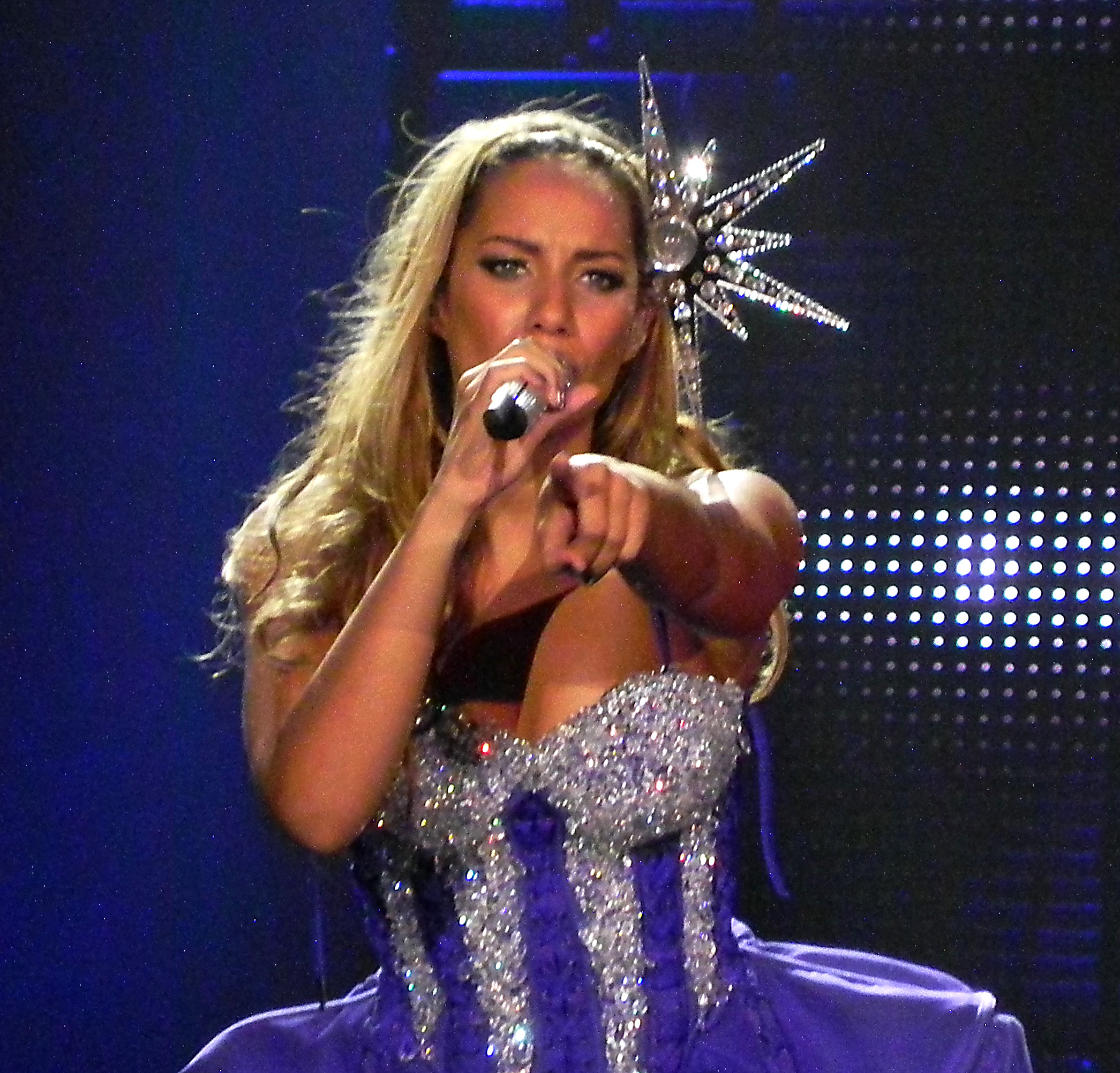
Lewis performing on The Labyrinth tour in 2010

Leona Lewis is a British singer, songwriter and vocal producer. She has recorded material for a demo album, five studio albums and an EP. She has also collaborated with other artists for duets and featured songs on other artists' albums, charity singles and soundtracks. Before winning the third series of the UK version of The X Factor, Lewis recorded a demo album entitled Best Kept Secret in 2004 and 2005, which was licensed by UEG Entertainment but not released. UEG spent approximately £70,000 on the singer's recording and production, but the demo failed to gain interest from record labels or executives. It was released by UEG in 2009, who claimed that they had the rights to the album, though Lewis revealed she had never signed a contract that stated Best Kept Secret could possibly be released.

After winning The X Factor in December 2006 and signing a £5 million contract with Simon Cowell's record label Syco and Clive Davis's J Records, Lewis began to work with writers Ryan Tedder and Steve Mac, among others, for her debut studio album Spirit, which was released in November 2007. The first single, "A Moment Like This", was released the day after Lewis won The X Factor, and its second single, "Bleeding Love", was released in October 2007. Lewis also covered Roberta Flack's "The First Time Ever I Saw Your Face" for the album. Cowell conceptualised the song "Footprints in the Sand", and was thus credited as a songwriter. Lewis also co-wrote the song "Here I Am" with Walter Afanasieff. The re-release of Spirit in November 2008 was followed by a cover of Snow Patrol's "Run".

According to Lewis, her second studio album, Echo was more guitar-orientated than Spirit. In addition to working with Tedder again, Lewis collaborated with Justin Timberlake on the track "Don't Let Me Down", for which he provided background vocals, and Kevin Rudolf on "Love Letter". Australian recording artist Che'Nelle co-wrote the song "Can't Breathe" with Lewis and five other songwriters. Lewis appeared on the soundtrack to the 2009 film Avatar on a song called "I See You (Theme from Avatar)". In August 2011, Lewis released a summer single entitled "Collide", a collaboration with Avicii. Although it was originally intended to be the lead single from her third studio album Glassheart, it was not included in the final track list. The singer released Hurt: The EP in December 2011, to bridge the gap for fans while she finished Glassheart, released in November 2012. The EP consisted of three covers: "Hurt" by Nine Inch Nails, "Iris" by the Goo Goo Dolls and "Colorblind" by Counting Crows.

Prior to the release of Glassheart, Lewis revealed that the album content would be very different from that which is present on Spirit and Echo, stating that although it would be "experimental", it would still have a "classic" sound. "Trouble", the lead single featuring Childish Gambino, combines elements of hip hop and trip hop music genres. It was also co-written by Lewis with Emeli Sandé, amongst others. Sandé co-wrote two other tracks called "I to You" and "Sugar". She also wrote a track entitled "Mountains" which was originally planned to be included on Glassheart's track list, however Sandé decided to reclaim the song and include on her debut album, Our Version of Events. Fraser T Smith, who was appointed by Lewis as the albums executive producer, was heavily involved with Glassheart's songwriting sessions, and is credited for co-writing "Trouble", "Un Love Me", "Come Alive", "Stop the Clocks" and "Fingerprint". Lewis reunited with Tedder on the track "Glassheart", a dubstep inspired song. Lewis co-wrote the song "Shake You Up" with Rodney "Darkchild" Jerkins and Olivia Waithe.

== Songs ==
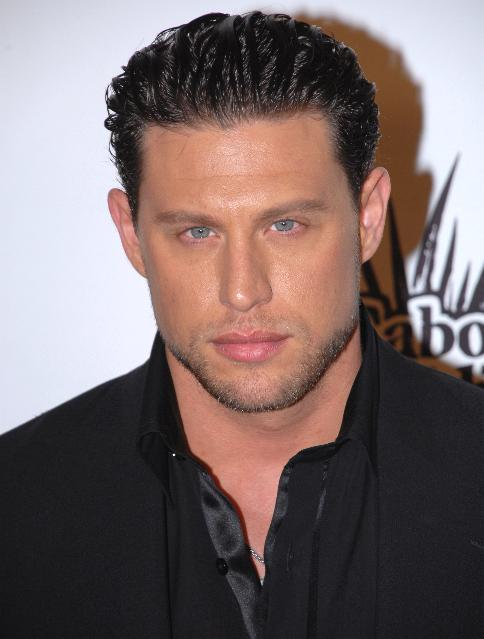
J.R. Rotem co-wrote "Better in Time".

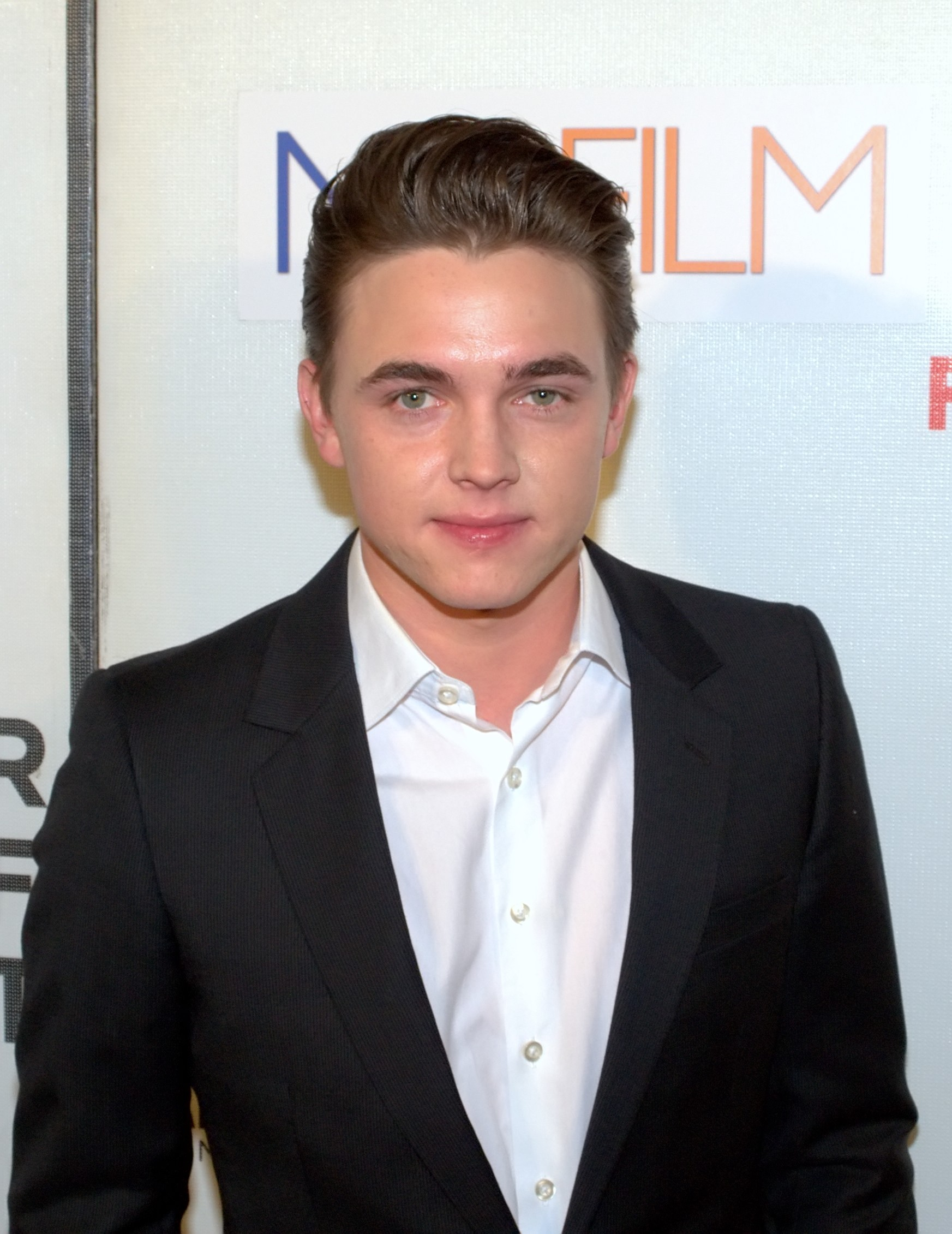
Jesse McCartney co-wrote "Bleeding Love" alongside Ryan Tedder.

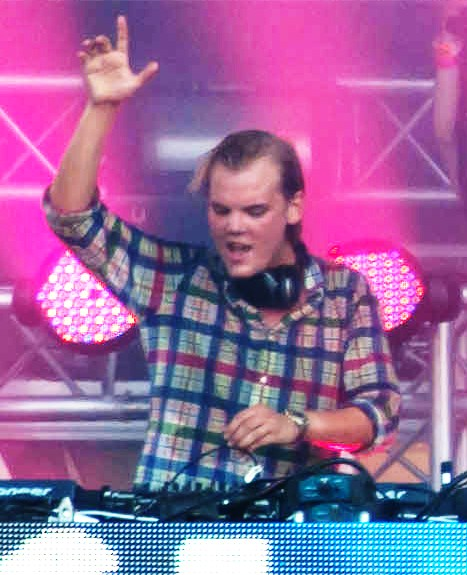
"Collide" contains a sample of Avicii's song "Penguin".

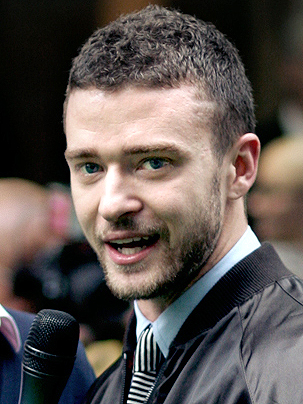
Justin Timberlake co-wrote the song "Don't Let Me Down" and contributed backing vocals.

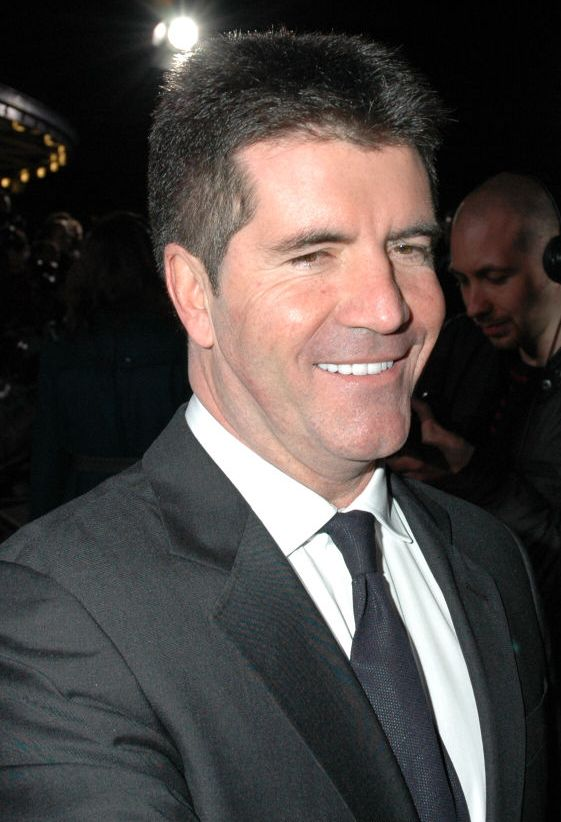
Simon Cowell came up with the idea to use some of the lyrics from the poem "Footprints" on Lewis' song "Footprints in the Sand", and was credited as a songwriter.

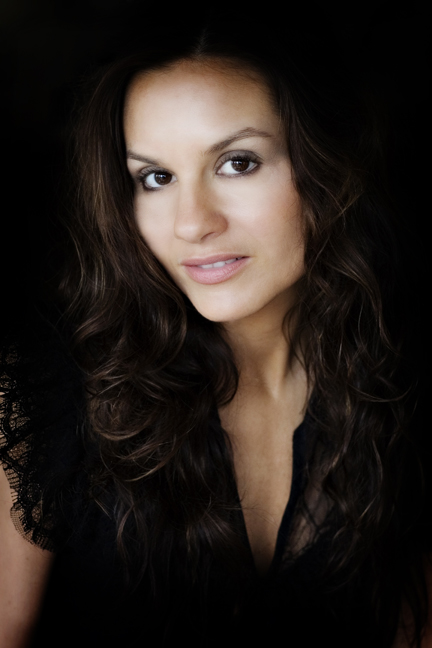
Kara DioGuardi co-wrote "Forgiveness".

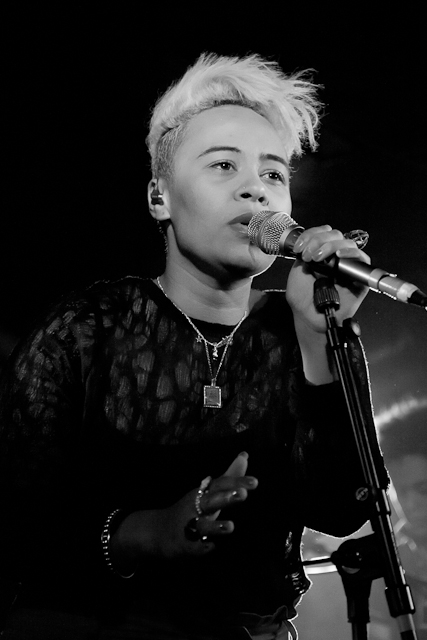
Emeli Sandé co-wrote "Trouble", the second single from Glassheart.

Name of song, writers, originating/intended album and year of release.
| Song | Writer(s) | Originating/Intended album | Year | Ref. |
|---|---|---|---|---|
| "A Moment Like This" | John Reid; Jörgen Elofsson | Spirit | 2007 | |
| "Alive" | Leona Lewis; Danielle Brisebois; John Shanks | Echo | 2009 | |
| "Angel" | Johntá Austin; Mikkel Storleer Eriksen & Tor Erik Hermansem | Spirit | 2007 | |
| "Another Love Song" | Leona Lewis; Toby Gad; Ben Kohn, Tom Barnes & Pete Kelleher | I Am | 2015 | |
| "Ave Maria" | Franz Schubert; Walter Scott | Christmas, with Love | 2013 | |
| "Bad Boy" | Barry Offoh | Best Kept Secret | 2005 | |
| "The Best You Never Had" | Josh Alexander; Billy Steinberg | Spirit | 2007 | |
| "Better in Time" | J. R. Rotem; Andrea Martin | Spirit | 2007 | |
| "Bleeding Love" | Ryan Tedder; Jesse McCartney | Spirit | 2007 | |
| "Brave" | Leona Lewis; Julian Bunetta; Andrew Frampton; Savan Kotecha | Echo | 2009 | |
| "Broken" | Leona Lewis; Alonzo "Novel" Stevenson; John Shanks | Echo | 2009 | |
| "Burn" (Note: "Burn" was originally recorded by Lewis for Glassheart but was not included on the tracklisting. Ellie Goulding would go on to record it for the re-issue of her second studio album, Halcyon (2012).) | Ryan Tedder; Ellie Goulding; Greg Kurstin; Noel Zancanella; Brent Kutzle | Glassheart | 2012 | |
| "Can't Breathe" | Leona Lewis; Gavriel Aminov; Uriel Kadouch; Lundon J. Knighten; Cheryline Lim; Michael Malih; Keith Ross | Echo | 2009 | |
| "Collide" with Avicii | Arash Pournouri; Autumn Rowe; Sandy Wilhelm; Simon Jeffes; Tim Berg | Single release only | 2011 | |
| "Come Alive" | Fraser T Smith; Ina Wroldsen | Glassheart | 2012 | |
| "Come Alive (Acoustic)" | Fraser T Smith; Ina Wroldsen | Glassheart | 2012 | |
| "Colorblind" | Adam Duritz; Charlie Gillingham | Hurt: The EP | 2011 | |
| "Colorblind (Acoustic)" | Adam Duritz; Charlie Gillingham | Glassheart | 2012 | |
| "Christmas (Baby Please Come Home)" | Jeff Barry; Ellie Greenwich; Phil Spector | Christmas, with Love | 2013 | |
| "Dip Down" featuring Loot | Barry Offoh | Best Kept Secret | 2005 | |
| "Don't Let Me Down" | Leona Lewis; James Fauntleroy; Justin Timberlake; Mike Elizondo; Robin Tadross | Echo | 2009 | |
| "Everybody Hurts" with Helping Haiti artists | Bill Berry; Michael Stipe; Mike Mills; Peter Buck | Single release only | 2010 | |
| "Favourite Scar" (Note: "Favourite Scar" contains elements of the Tears for Fears song "Head over Heels" written by Roland Orzabal and Curt Smith.) | Leona Lewis; Ryan Tedder; Noel Zancanella; Roland Orzabal; Curt Smith | Glassheart | 2012 | |
| "Fingerprint" | Leona Lewis; Fraser T Smith; Laura Pergolizzi | Glassheart | 2012 | |
| "Fire Under My Feet" | Leona Lewis; Toby Gad | I Am | 2015 | |
| "Fire Under My Feet (United Studios Sessions)" | Leona Lewis; Toby Gad | I Am | 2015 | |
| "Fireflies" | Craigie Dodds | Glassheart | 2012 | |
| "The First Time Ever I Saw Your Face" | Ewan MacColl | Spirit | 2007 | |
| "Fly Here Now" | Leona Lewis; Jeff Bhasker | Echo | 2009 | |
| "Footprints in the Sand" | David Kreuger; Per Magnusson; Richard Page; Simon Cowell | Spirit | 2007 | |
| "Forgive Me" | Aliaune Thiam; Claude Kelly; Giorgio Tuinfort | Spirit | 2007 | |
| "Forgiveness" | Kara DioGuardi; Leona Lewis; Salaam Remi | Spirit | 2007 | |
| "Glassheart" | Leona Lewis; Brent Kutzle; Fis Shkreli; Justin Franks; Noel Zancanella; Peter Svensson; Ryan Tedder | Glassheart | 2012 | |
| "Glassheart (Acoustic)" | Leona Lewis; Brent Kutzle; Fis Shkreli; Justin Franks; Noel Zancanella; Peter Svensson; Ryan Tedder | Glassheart | 2012 | |
| "Happy" | Leona Lewis; E. Kidd Bogart; Ryan Tedder | Echo | 2009 | |
| "Heartbeat" | Leona Lewis; Arnthor Birgisson; Ina Wroldsen | B-side to "I Got You" | 2010 | |
| "Here I Am" | Leona Lewis; Brett James; Walter Afanasieff | Spirit | 2007 | |
| "Homeless" | Jörgen Elofsson | Spirit | 2007 | |
| "Hurt" | Trent Reznor | Hurt: The EP | 2011 | |
| "I Am" | Leona Lewis; Toby Gad; Eg White | I Am | 2015 | |
| "I Am (Acoustic)" | Leona Lewis; Toby Gad; Eg White | I Am | 2015 | |
| "I Can't Say Hello" | Barry Offoh | Best Kept Secret | 2005 | |
| "I Got You" | Arnthor Birgisson; Max Martin; Savan Kotecha | Echo | 2009 | |
| "I Got You" | Leona Lewis; Toby Gad | I Am | 2015 | |
| "I Know Who I Am" | Gregory William Barnhill; Joanna Cotten; Melissa Toni Manchester | For Colored Girls | 2010 | |
| "I See You" | James Horner; Kuk Harrell; Simon Franglen | Avatar | 2010 | |
| "I to You" | Leona Lewis; Christopher Crowhurst; Emeli Sandé | Glassheart | 2012 | |
| "I Wanna Be That Girl" | Barry Offoh | Best Kept Secret | 2005 | |
| "I Will Be" | Avril Lavigne; Lukasz Gottwald; Max Martin | Spirit | 2007 | |
| "I Wish It Could Be Christmas Everyday" | Roy Wood | Christmas, with Love | 2013 | |
| "If I Can't Have You" | Barry, Maurice and Robin Gibb | Christmas, with Love Always | 2021 | |
| "I'm So into You" | Brian Morgan | Best Kept Secret | 2005 | |
| "I'm You" | Eric Hudson; Shaffer Smith | Spirit | 2007 | |
| "Inaspettata (Unexpected)" (with Biagio Antonacci) | Biagio Antonacci; Leona Lewis | Inaspettata | 2010 | |
| "Iris" | John Rzeznik | Hurt: The EP | 2011 | |
| "Joy" | Barry Offoh | Best Kept Secret | 2005 | |
| "Just Stand Up!" with Various artists | Kenneth "Babyface" Edmonds; Ronnie Walton | Single release only | 2008 | |
| "Kiss Me It's Christmas" with Ne-Yo or Iain James | Anya Jones; Biff Stannard; Iain James; Jez Ashurst | Christmas, with Love Always | 2021 | |
| "Ladders" | Leona Lewis; Wayne Wilkins; Anne Preven; Kevin Anyaeji | I Am | 2015 | |
| "Let It Rain" | Leona Lewis; Danielle Brisebois; John Shanks | Echo | 2009 | |
| "Lost Then Found" with OneRepublic | Leona Lewis; Dan Muckala; Jess Cates; Lindy Robbins; Ryan Tedder | Echo | 2009 | |
| "L.O.V.E.U." | Barry Offoh | Best Kept Secret | 2005 | |
| "Lovebird" | Bonnie McKee; Joshua Coleman; Lukasz Gottwald | Glassheart | 2012 | |
| "Love Is Your Color" with Jennifer Hudson | Claude Kelly; Michael R. Mentore; Salaam Remi | Sex and the City 2 | 2010 | |
| "Love Letter" | J. Kasher; Kevin Rudolf | Echo | 2009 | |
| "Misses Glass" | Timothy Thomas & Theron Thomas | Spirit | 2007 | |
| "Mountains" (Note: "Mountains" was originally recorded by Lewis for Glassheart but it was reclaimed by the song's co-writer Emeli Sandé for her debut album, Our Version of Events (2012).) | Luke Juby; Shahid Khan; James Murray; Mustafa Omer; Emeli Sandé | Glassheart | 2011 | |
| "Mr Right" | Leona Lewis; Richard Stannard; Camille Purcell; Jez Ashurst; Ash Howes | Christmas, with Love | 2013 | |
| "My Hands" | Arnthor Birgisson; Ina Wroldsen | Echo | 2009 | |
| "Myself" featuring Novel | Leona Lewis; Alonzo "Novel" Stevenson; Graham N. Marsh; Justin E. Boykin | Spirit | 2007 | |
| "Naked" | Leona Lewis; Kristian Lundin; Savan Kotecha | Echo | 2009 | |
| "O Holy Night" | Adolphe Adam | Christmas, with Love | 2013 | |
| "One More Sleep" | Leona Lewis; Richard Stannard; Iain James; Jez Ashurst; Bradford Ellis | Christmas, with Love | 2013 | |
| "Outta My Head" | Karl Johan Schuster; Max Martin; Savan Kotecha | Echo | 2009 | |
| "Power" | Leona Lewis; Toby Gad; James Eliot | I Am | 2015 | |
| "Private Party" | Barry Offoh | Best Kept Secret | 2005 | |
| "Ready to Get Down" | Barry Offoh | Best Kept Secret | 2005 | |
| "Ride a White Swan" | Marc Bolan | The Labyrinth Tour Live from The O2 | 2010 | |
| "Run" | Gary Lightbody; Iain Archer; Jonathan Quinn; Mark McClelland; Nathan Connolly | Spirit | 2008 | |
| "Shake You Up" | Leona Lewis; Olivia Waithe; Rodney 'Darkchild' Jerkins | Glassheart | 2012 | |
| "Silent Night" | Franz Xaver Gruber; Joseph Mohr | Christmas, with Love | 2013 | |
| "Silly Girl" | Barry Offoh | Best Kept Secret | 2005 | |
| "Stone Hearts and Hand Grenades" | Leona Lewis; Andrew Frampton; E. Kidd Bogart; Julian Bunetta | Echo | 2009 | |
| "Stop Crying Your Heart Out" | Noel Gallagher | Echo | 2009 | |
| "Stop the Clocks" | Leona Lewis; Fraser T Smith; Jörgen Elofsson; Rachel Moulden | Glassheart | 2012 | |
| "Sugar" | Alexander Shuckburg; Emeli Sandé | Glassheart | 2012 | |
| "Take a Bow" | Louis Biancaniello; Ryan Tedder; Sam Watters; Wayne Wilkins | Spirit | 2008 | |
| "Thank You" | Leona Lewis; Toby Gad; Anne Preven | I Am | 2015 | |
| "The Best and the Worst" | Leona Lewis; Toby Gad; Jonny Coffer; Shahid Khan | I Am | 2015 | |
| "The Essence of Me" | Leona Lewis; Toby Gad | I Am | 2015 | |
| "They Don't Care About Us" | Michael Jackson | The Labyrinth Tour Live from The O2 | 2010 | |
| "Thick Skin" | Leona Lewis; Toby Gad | I Am | 2015 | |
| "Thunder" | Leona Lewis; Toby Gad | I Am | 2015 | |
| "Thunder (Acoustic)" | Leona Lewis; Toby Gad | I Am | 2015 | |
| "Trouble" featuring Childish Gambino | Leona Lewis; Emeli Sandé; Fraser T Smith; Hugo Chegwin; Harry Craze; James Murray; Musta Omer; Shahid Khan; Donald Glover | Glassheart | 2012 | |
| "Trouble (Acoustic)" | Leona Lewis; Emeli Sandé; Fraser T Smith; Hugo Chegwin; Harry Craze; James Murray; Musta Omer; Shahid Khan | Glassheart | 2012 | |
| "Un Love Me" | Leona Lewis; Bonnie McKee; Fraser T Smith; Kelly Sheehan | Glassheart | 2012 | |
| "We Found Love" (Note: "We Found Love" was originally recorded by Lewis for Glassheart but when the album was delayed, it was reclaimed by the song's writer Calvin Harris and then given to Rihanna for her fifth studio album, Talk That Talk (2011).) | Calvin Harris | Glassheart | 2012 | |
| "Whatever It Takes" | Leona Lewis; Alonzo "Novel" Stevenson; Tony Reyes | Spirit | 2008 | |
| "White Christmas" | Irving Berlin | Christmas, with Love | 2013 | |
| "Winter Wonderland" | Felix Bernard; Dick Smith | Christmas, with Love | 2013 | |
| "Yesterday" | Jordan Omley; Louis Biancaniello; Michael Mani; Nina Woodford; Sam Watters | Spirit | 2007 | |
| "You Bring Me Down" | Leona Lewis; Salaam Remi; Taj Jackson | Spirit | 2007 | |
| "You Don't Care" | Leona Lewis; Ryan Tedder | Echo | 2009 | |
| "You Knew Me When" | Diane Warren | I Am | 2015 | |
| "Your Hallelujah" | Leona Lewis; Jon Irvine; Autumn Rowe; Lauren Christy | Christmas, with Love | 2013 | |
