= I Am Tour (Leona Lewis) =

2016 concert tour by Leona Lewis

- Tour by Leona Lewis
- Promotional poster for the tour
- Associated album: I Am
- Start date: 21 February 2016
- End date: 11 March 2016
- Legs: 1
- No. of shows: 14

Leona Lewis concert chronology
- Glassheart Tour (2013); I Am Tour (2016); Christmas with Love Tour (2023)

The I Am Tour was the third headlining concert tour by English singer Leona Lewis. It was launched in support of her fifth studio album, I Am (2015). The tour was announced on 11 September 2015 with a run of fourteen dates across Great Britain. It began on 21 February 2016 at the Liverpool Empire Theatre and concluded on 11 March 2016 at the Plymouth Pavilions. The leg also included two nights at the London Palladium. The English singer-songwriter Philippa Hanna served as the support act, and the English singer-songwriter Joss Stone joined Lewis on stage as a special guest for the final show of the tour to perform a cover of "Sisters Are Doin' It for Themselves" by Eurythmics and Aretha Franklin.

Lewis performed a nineteen-song set list with a four-piece band and two backup vocalists. Her vocals, stage presence and interaction with the crowds was lauded by the critics in attendance. Many singled out her performance of "Ave Maria" as the set's highlight, while others also praised renditions of "The First Time Ever I Saw Your Face", "A Moment Like This" and "Run". Several noted that nearly a third of the set list consisted of both official covers recorded by Lewis previously included on her albums, as well as cover songs intended just for the tour. Some were complimentary of the unofficial covers, most notably Lewis' version of "Time After Time" by Cyndi Lauper, whereas others felt that there were too many and that they were too forgettable.

== Background ==
To promote her fifth studio album, I Am (2015), on 11 September 2015 Leona Lewis announced her third headlining concert tour, titled the I Am Tour, was to take place in February and March 2016. It was her first concert tour since the Glassheart Tour in 2013. Spanning fourteen shows visiting various concert halls and theatres in England, Scotland and Wales, the tour began at the Liverpool Empire Theatre on 21 February and concluded at the Plymouth Pavilions on 11 March; it also included two dates at the London Palladium. Lewis announced the tour on 11 September 2015 and tickets went on sale a week later on 18 September. Speaking about touring again, Lewis said that she was "So so excited to announce a 2016 UK Tour! I cannot wait to get out and perform all the new songs for you and some old favourites too!" In an interview for What's On magazine in December 2015, Lewis revealed that she had originally planned for the tour to be longer, but decided to shorten it in order to spend time with family and friends and start writing songs for her sixth studio album sooner.

== Critical reception ==
Katie Fitzpatrick of the Manchester Evening News reported that fans in attendance at the Manchester Bridgewater Hall show were impressed with Lewis' performance, writing that many took to social media following the concert to describe her as "the best singer in the world". Reporting on the show at The Sage Gateshead, the Chronicle Live critic Gordon Barr praised Lewis' confidence and her band. He noted that the production was relatively simple compared to the big-budget production values of her first concert tour in 2010, The Labyrinth. With the tour featuring just two background vocalists and a four-piece band, Barr wrote that it was "so refreshing to see an artist on stage just loving the music". He singled out performances of "Ave Maria", "Run", and a cover of "Time After Time" by Cyndi Lauper as the show's highlights. Barr described the performance of "Time After Time" as "stripped back to the core" which enabled the crowd to "really [hear] that incredible voice at its best". Allan Jones of the Bournemouth Echo was also complimentary of Lewis' performance during the show at the Bournemouth International Centre. Although he disapproved of the performance of "Ave Maria" (but noted that it garnered a standing ovation from the crowd), he thought that standout performances included "Run", "Bleeding Love", and Lewis' cover of "The First Time Ever I Saw Your Face" by Roberta Flack. He concluded his review by writing that Lewis has "that really big soul/pop voice that should see her continuing to pack venues for the next ten years".

Lewis performing "I Am" at the London Palladium on 5 March 2016. Caroline Abbott of the Torquay Herald Express described the backdrop as "five strips of giant toilet paper".

Adrian Caffery of the Birmingham Mail gave a mixed review of the show at the city's Symphony Hall. While he was complimentary of Lewis' vocals performances on most of the original tracks, most notably on "Ave Maria", which he described as demonstrating "an amazing transformation to opera diva", he was critical of Lewis' decision to include seven cover songs on the set list. Although Caffery wrote that "Run", "The First Time Ever I Saw Your Face", "Ave Maria", and "A Moment Like This" – the last of which he described as "cheesy" – were to be expected, as Lewis had recorded them for previous albums. However, he disapproved of "Time After Time", labelling it "ok", and called the Sam Smith covers "instantly forgettable". He concluded by writing: "There was enough evidence to suggest Leona is capable of staging an utterly mesmerising show from start to finish – just not this time". A critic from The Bristol Post wrote that Lewis "dazzled" the audience who "[enjoyed] Leona's impressive vocals and stunning songs", placing emphasis on her rendition of "Time After Time".

In a review of Lewis' performance at the London Palladium on 5 March, William J Connolly of Gay Times praised the singer's openness regarding her personal and private life throughout the show, which gave the audience an insight as to "why she's remained quiet in previous months and why, as we all love, each album is full of emotion and honesty". He singled out "The First Time Ever I Saw Your Face", "Bleeding Love", and "Thunder" as the show's highlights, and described "Run" as "perfect". Emma Noye of the Ipswich Star wrote that despite there being some Americanisms in the show, such as "horse-riding, beach-walking backing visuals with a voiceover talking about the 'journey' she's been on", Lewis' voice was "indisputably fantastic". Noye went on to write that the singer "made everyone feel included and engaged" and praised her performance of "Ave Maria" as "stunning".

In her review of the concert at the Plymouth Pavilions, Caroline Abbott of the Torquay Herald Express praised Lewis for her interaction with the crowd and her "down-to-earth" persona, as well as her performances of "Ave Maria", "Thank You", and "Sisters Are Doin' It for Themselves", a duet with the special guest Joss Stone. Noting that a third of the set-list was made up of covers, she expressed dislike for Lewis' interpretation of "Time After Time". Abbott wrote that her "only real criticism" of the performance was for the stage production, which she described as "five strips of giant toilet paper hanging at the back, occasionally changing colour, and spaced a little too far apart to make for easy viewing of the video footage of Leona explaining why her music is so important to her". Abbott did, however, note that the backdrop did not detract from the "high quality music" or her "incredible, effortless voice".

== Set list ==
Lewis performing "Run" with The Big Sing Choir at the London Palladium on 5 March 2016.

The following set list is representative of the show in Liverpool. It is not intended to represent all dates throughout the tour.

1. "I Am"
2. "Better in Time"
3. "Footprints in the Sand"
4. "A Moment Like This"
5. "Bleeding Love"
6. "The Essence of Me"
7. "Time After Time"
8. "Thank You"
9. "Stay with Me"
10. "Fire Under My Feet"
11. "Ladders"
12. "Latch"
13. "Power"
14. "Ave Maria"
15. "The First Time Ever I Saw Your Face"
16. "Happy"
17. "Thunder"

Encore

18. "I Got You"
19. "Run"

Notes

- For the final show in Plymouth, Lewis was joined onstage by Joss Stone to perform "Sisters Are Doin' It for Themselves".

== Shows ==
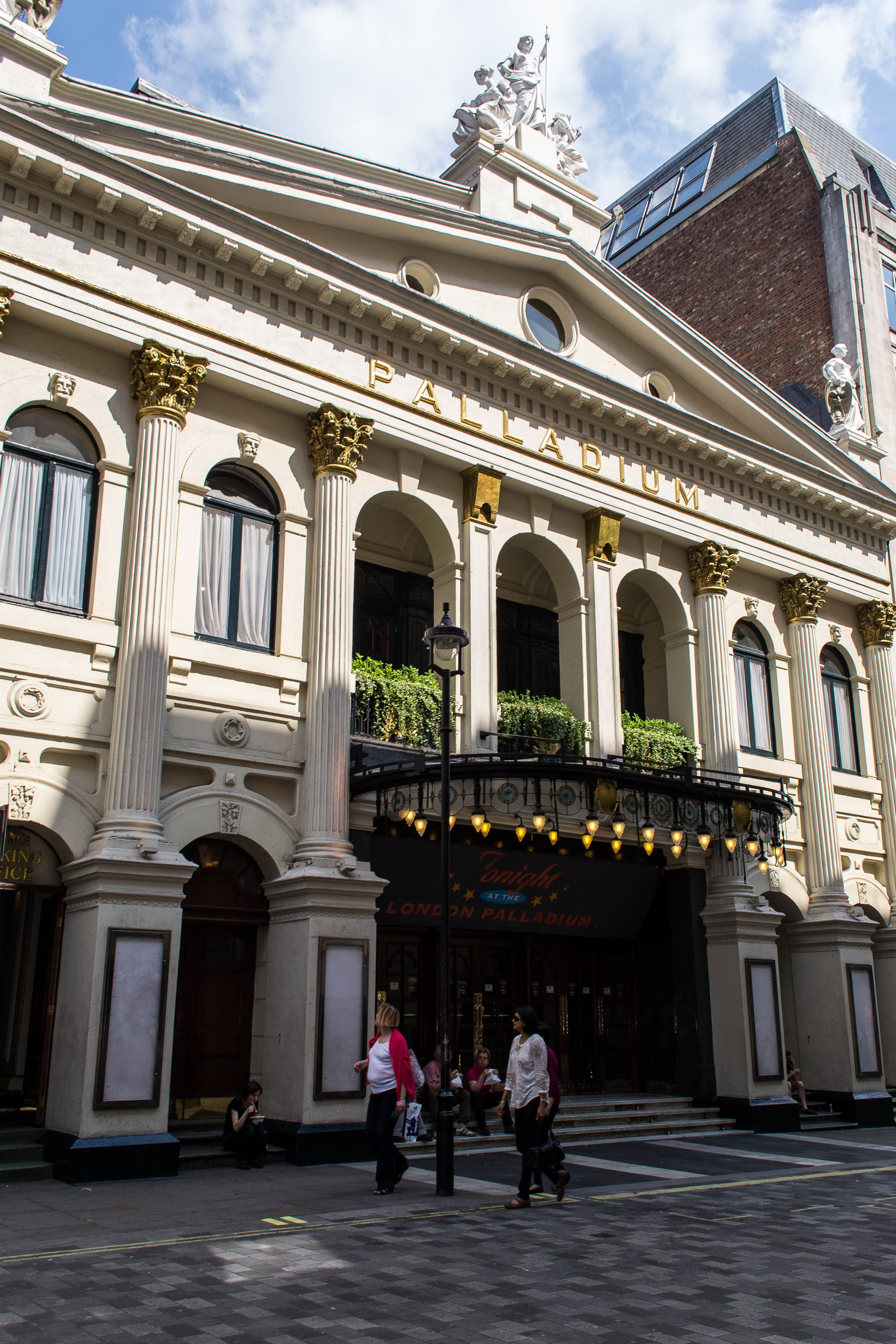
The I Am Tour included two nights at the London Palladium.

List of concerts, showing date, city, country, venue, opening act, tickets sold, number of available tickets and amount of gross revenue
Date	City	Country	Venue	Opening act	Attendance	Revenue
Leg One — Great Britain
21 February 2016	Liverpool	England	Liverpool Empire Theatre	Philippa Hanna	—	—
22 February 2016	Sheffield	England	Sheffield City Hall	Philippa Hanna	—	—
24 February 2016	Manchester	England	Bridgewater Hall	Philippa Hanna	—	—
25 February 2016	Gateshead	England	The Sage Gateshead	Philippa Hanna	—	—
27 February 2016	Bournemouth	England	Bournemouth International Centre	Philippa Hanna	—	—
28 February 2016	Birmingham	England	Symphony Hall	Philippa Hanna	—	—
1 March 2016	Bristol	England	Colston Hall	Philippa Hanna	—	—
2 March 2016	Cardiff	Wales	St David's Hall	Philippa Hanna	—	—
4 March 2016	London	England	London Palladium	Philippa Hanna	—	—
5 March 2016	London	England	London Palladium	Philippa Hanna	—	—
7 March 2016	Ipswich	England	Regent Theatre	Philippa Hanna	—	—
8 March 2016	Glasgow	Scotland	Clyde Auditorium	Philippa Hanna	1,329 / 1,716 (78%)	$85,394
10 March 2016	Nottingham	England	Royal Concert Hall	Philippa Hanna	—	—
11 March 2016	Plymouth	England	Plymouth Pavilions	Philippa Hanna	—	—
Total					1,329 / 1,716 (78%)	$85,394
