= (We All Are) Looking for Home =

Single by Leona Lewis and Diane Warren
- Released: 17 June 2016
- Length: 2:52
- Label: The Vanderpump Dog Foundation
- Songwriter(s): Diane Warren

Leona Lewis singles chronology
"Thunder" (2015)	"(We All Are) Looking for Home" (2016)	"You Are the Reason" (2018)

Audio video
- "[We Are All] Looking for Home" on YouTube

"(We All Are) Looking for Home" is a charity single recorded by British singer and songwriter Leona Lewis, which was written by the Grammy Award-winning songwriter Diane Warren.

It is their second collaboration. Warren wrote the track "You Knew Me When" for Lewis' fifth studio album, I Am (2015). As Lewis and Warren are animal rights activists, they decided to work together again on a track that would raise awareness of the torturous cruelty to dogs around the world.

"(We All Are) Looking for Home" was recorded and released to raise awareness of The Vanderpump Dog Foundation, owned by Lisa Vanderpump and Ken Todd. Speaking about the campaign, Todd said, "It is our vision that this song will represent a movement to a more humane world for dogs everywhere and symbolize the global outcry for change." Vanderpump expressed her excitement at working with Lewis and Warren, adding, "We are very excited to be working alongside such innovative women like Diane and Leona. They are just as passionate about this campaign as we are, and we truly appreciate their support." The song supported the Stop Yulin Forever campaign in particular, which advocates for the end of the Lychee and Dog Meat Festival. The festival, which takes place in June each year, sees up to 10,000 dogs and cats slaughtered for their meat.

== Release history ==
Country	Date	Format	Label	Ref.
Canada	17 June 2016	Digital download	The Vanderpump Dog Foundation	
United Kingdom	17 June 2016	Digital download	The Vanderpump Dog Foundation	
United States	17 June 2016	Digital download	The Vanderpump Dog Foundation	
