= I Am (Leona Lewis song) =

Single by Leona Lewis

from the album I Am
- Released: 17 July 2015
- Studio: Kensaltown Studios (London, UK)
- Genre: Breakbeat
- Length: 3:42
- Label: Island
- Songwriters: Leona Lewis; Toby Gad; Francis "Eg" White
- Producers: Toby Gad; Eg White

Leona Lewis singles chronology
"Fire Under My Feet" (2015)	"I Am" (2015)	"Thunder" (2015)

Music video
- "Leona Lewis - I Am" on YouTube

"I Am" is a song by British singer and songwriter Leona Lewis from her fifth studio album of the same name. The song was written by Lewis, Toby Gad and Eg White, with Gad and White producing it. Lyrically, "I Am" is about the feelings and emotions experienced by Lewis following her departure from her former record label Syco and its boss, Simon Cowell. It is a dance-influenced track which makes use of strings, piano and drums as part of its instrumentation. Its composition garnered comparisons to singers Avril Lavigne and Massive Attack. Island released "I Am" on 17 July 2015 as the lead single for the United Kingdom, but it is the second single to be released from the album overall. Remixes by Fastlane and DEVolution were also released. The track garnered a positive response from music critics, many of whom praised Lewis' strong and emotive vocal performance and described it as a standout on the album. Lewis has performed the song live on The National Lottery: In It to Win It and at the BBC's Radio 2 Live in Hyde Park festival.

== Background and composition ==
"I Am" was written by Leona Lewis, Toby Gad and Eg White, with Gad and White producing the track, for Lewis's fifth studio album of the same name (2015). It was published by ASCAP and Atlas Music publishings (on behalf of itself and Gadfly Songs (ASCAP) and Kobalt Music Group Ltd. White performed much of the song's instrumentation, and is credited with playing the piano, drums, bass and bells, as well as the string and drum programming. The strings were recorded by White and Kristian Larsen in Studio A at Kensaltown Studios, and were arranged by White, transcribed by Clarissa Farran, and contracted by Hilary Skewes. The violins were played by Marije Johnston, Kotono Sato, Max Baillie, Bea Lovejoy, Warren Zielinksi, Janice Graham, Helen Paterson and Hannah Dawson. Meghan Cassidy and James Boyd played the viola, while David Cohen and Ben Chappell played the cello. "I Am" was mixed by Wez Clarke, with additional mixing carried out by Gad at Kite Music Studios in Los Angeles. The track's audio was mastered by Tom Coyne at Sterling Sound studios in New York City, with assistance from Randy Merrill. Lewis provided all of the vocals for the track. For the acoustic version of "I Am", Gad undertook all of the instrumentation and also performed the mixing.

"I Am" is a dance-influenced song. Some critics believe the lyrics allude to Lewis' emotions and feelings following her departure from Syco Records and Simon Cowell, her former label boss and friend. Digital Spy writer Lewis Corner felt that the title track had very few barriers, exemplified by the lyrics "I am, with or without you / I am, breathing without you / I am, somebody without you." Lewis performs the lyrics over an instrumentation of "rousing" strings and breakbeats. As she sings "I won't change for you," a heavy drum beat and occasional piano chimes reminiscent of songs by Avril Lavigne are played.

== Release and remixes ==
On 30 June 2015, Lewis released a three-minute teaser video with snippets of "I Am", "Ladders, "Power" and "Thunder". "I Am" was released as the second single from the album and lead single for the United Kingdom; it was not promoted in the United States due to the decision to release the album's third overall single "Thunder" as its lead single instead. The full length version of "I Am" premiered on BBC Radio 2 on 17 July 2015. The same day, the track was made available as an automatic download for anyone who had previously pre-ordered the album. A two-track remix EP with dance remixes by Fastlane and DEVolution was also made available as a digital download on 17 July in the United Kingdom, Australia, France, Germany, Ireland, and New Zealand. "I Am" was added to BBC Radio 2's B-list playlist on 15 August.

== Critical reception ==
Kathy Iandoli of Idolator highlighted "I Am" as a "gorgeous standout" example of Lewis' ability to "just [sing]" a song as opposed to using auto-tune on "Power" and over-singing on "I Got You". Lewis Corner of Digital Spy felt that the track put "Simon [Cowell] in his place in a way Louis Walsh could only dream of." Brad O'Mance for Popjustice likened the song to Massive Attack's 1991 song "Unfinished Sympathy" "with a different song on top", while Official Charts Company writer Rob Copsey described it as "gutsy and uplifting". However, Michael Clemons of The Daily Reveille thought that while it was not a stand out track, it was a good listen. Chuck Campbell of Knoxville News Sentinel thought that the track's lyrical theme, and the album's theme as a whole, was flawed as a concept, writing "The problem with repeatedly declaring you don’t need the approval of someone who has wronged you is that your message is false. Clearly if Lewis indulges in six straight bitter songs about defiantly rebounding from a bad relationship (which she does on “I Am”), she obviously craves validation from the very person (or people) who did her dirty."

== Live performance ==
Lewis performed "I Am" for the first time during a live showcase at the Hospital Club in London on 14 April 2015. The singer premiered four other tracks from I Am including "Ladders", "I Got You", "Thank You" and "Fire Under My Feet". Lewis later performed the track live on The National Lottery: In It to Win It on 12 September 2015, and again the following day at the BBC's Radio 2 Live in Hyde Park festival. The set-list also included performances of "Better in Time", "Bleeding Love", "Run", "Fire Under My Feet" and "I Got You". "I Am" was included as the opening song on her 2016 concert tour of the same name.

== Formats and versions ==
Digital download – album version

- "I Am" – 3:42

Digital download – acoustic album version

- "I Am" 3:26

Digital download – I Am Remixes

1. "I Am" (Fastlane remix) – 4:44
2. "I Am" (DEVolution remix) – 4:51

== Personnel ==
Credits sourced from album booklet and liner.

- Leona Lewis - vocals, composer
- Ben Chappell - cello
- David Cohen - cello
- Hilary Skews - strings (contractor)
- Wez Clarke - mixing
- Toby Gad - additional mixing, composer
- Eg White - piano, strings programming, drum programming, bass, bells, recording (strings), arranger (strings), composer
- Kristian Larsen - recording (strings)
- Clarissa Farran - strings transcription
- James Boyd - viola
- Meghan Cassidy - viola
- Bea Lovejoy - violin
- Hannah Dawson - violin
- Helen Paterson - violin
- Janice Graham - violin
- Kotono Sato - violin
- Marije Johnston - violin
- Max Baillie - violin
- Warren Zielinski - violin

== Release history ==
Country	Version	Date	Format	Label	Ref.
United Kingdom	Original	17 July 2015	Radio premiere	Island	
United Kingdom	Original	17 July 2015	Automatic download (From album pre-order)	Island	
Australia	Remix EP	17 July 2015	Digital download	Island	
France	Remix EP	17 July 2015	Digital download	Island	
Germany	Remix EP	17 July 2015	Digital download	Island	
Ireland	Remix EP	17 July 2015	Digital download	Island	
New Zealand	Remix EP	17 July 2015	Digital download	Island	
United Kingdom	Remix EP	17 July 2015	Digital download	Island	
United Kingdom	Original	15 August 2015	BBC Radio 2 B-list playlist	Island	
