= Tom Swoon =

Polish DJ

- Tom Swoon in 2016
- Born: Dorian Kamil Tomasiak; 6 June 1993 (age 33); Goleniów, Poland
- Other names: Tom Swoon; Pixel Cheese; Dorian Numan
- Occupations: Electronic musician; DJ; record producer
- Years active: 2010-2017 2025-Present
- Status: Released
- Criminal charges: Manslaughter; Drunk driving
- Penalty: 4 years and 8 months in prison (as of September 2018)
- Musical career
- Genres: Progressive house; electro house; future house
- Labels: Ultra; Armada; Revealed; Spinnin'
- Website: web.archive.org/web/20120715074442/http://www.tomswoon.com/

Dorian Kamil Tomasiak (born 6 June 1993), known professionally as Tom Swoon (and previously as Pixel Cheese), is a Polish DJ and record producer.

Tom Swoon used to host Lift Off Radio on Electro City on Dash Radio. He debuted in the DJ Mag's 2015 Top 100 DJs voting poll at number 46.

On 5 December 2017, Tomasiak and was arrested in a car accident that led to the death of one person and injured another, was charged for drunk driving and manslaughter. On 6 June 2018, Tomasiak announced the end of the "Tom Swoon" project in a public statement letter sent from prison. He was later sentenced to four years and eight months of prison. He was since then released. In 2025 Tom Swoon returned to music under the new alias Dorian Numan, stated that he wants to give himself and his music career a second chance.

== Biography ==
Tomasiak was born on 6 June 1993 in Goleniów, Poland. His interest in music started at a very young age. At the age of 17, he discovered electronic dance music and was inspired by artists such as deadmau5 and Daft Punk. Over the next few years, by 2010, he taught himself into DJing and saved up his earnings and bought a DJ setup, transforming himself from a bedroom DJ into an artist with a drive for music production.

In late 2011, his first official remix of Gareth Emery's single "Tokyo" was released on Garuda and climbed into Beatport's Top 100 chart. This remix was followed by two other remixes for Steve Aoki and Kaskade, "Ladi Dadi" and "Room for Happiness", respectively. In March 2012, his debut track, "Elva", was released on Ultra Records. Two months later, he remixed Nervo's "You're Gonna Love Again" on EMI, his last release under the alias Pixel Cheese.

Securing over twenty tour dates in his debut year to complement his original releases and remixes, Tom Swoon ended the year warming up for Avicii on his concert tour and on a tour of India with Steve Aoki. Nominated by Nervo as their 'Breakthrough Artist DJ for 2012', and voted as the "Polish Breakthrough DJ of the Year" by FTB Poland, both Mixmag and Billboard Magazine called Swoon an 'Artist to Watch' in 2013.

With his remix of Bloody Beetroots - "Chronicles of a Fallen Love", he received further acclaim. His collaboration with Amba Shepherd, "Not Too Late", was followed by a remix package by Bassnectar and Patrick Reza, Maor Levi, Sebjak and Josef Belani. "Not Too Late" also premiered Tom Swoon's first official music video, which was shot and produced in Tokyo. Swoon was called in for another set of remixes for Nervo, Sultan & Ned Shepard's single "Army" and Benny Benassi's collaboration with John Legend called "Dance The Pain Away". In between such duties, Tom's fourth single, "Wings", was released in July and received support from a variety of dance musicians, with the remix by Myon & Shane 54 topping the Beatport trance chart at the No. 1 position for several weeks.

In the third quarter of 2013, Tom Swoon released another collaboration titled "Rollercoaster", together with Josef Belani. On 29 October 2013, he released his remix of Burn It Down by American rock band Linkin Park, which was included in their album Recharged. In December 2013, Tom Swoon launched his own weekly radio show and podcast titled "LIFT OFF Radio", which was broadcast through iTunes and Soundcloud.

In late 2013, he released "Synchronize", a collaboration with Paris Blohm and Hadouken!, which reached the No. 12 position on Beatport progressive charts and hovered for over a month on the top No. 20. 2014 saw the release of his collaboration "Wait" with Paris & Simo, which was released on Spinnin Records. Later that year, DJ Mag also revealed that he had placed 130th in voting for their annual Top 100 DJs poll.

=== Accident and end of a career ===
In the early morning of 5 December 2017, traveling along the S3 expressway from Goleniów to Szczecin just before 5:00, Swoon was driving his car under the influence of alcohol and caused an accident killing one person and seriously harming another at the height of Kliniska Wielkie. Swoon was arrested on the same day, and a few days later, the prosecutor's office accused him of causing a fatal accident and driving under the influence of alcohol. He threatened him at the time from 2 to 12 years in prison without the possibility of conditional suspension of a penalty and a lifetime ban on driving.

==== Downfall ====
Together with that accident, further career of the musician was questioned. A moment after the incident, Dutch label Spinnin Records broke the contract with him and canceled his last completed single. Since then, there was silence about the DJ, until he published the content of his letter via Facebook Manager in a public statement on 6 June 2018, that he will be ending his career in music. He declared that he is never planning to return to the world of music anymore, and after serving a prison sentence he wants to start a new life.

Exactly six months ago, while under the influence of alcohol, I caused a traffic accident that resulted in the death of one person. I pleaded guilty and have been in custody awaiting trial ever since. I am writing this letter because I want to sincerely apologize. I apologize to the family who lost their loved one—I cannot imagine the pain I inadvertently caused that night, which likely endures to this day. I also apologize to everyone who was disappointed in me—I cannot understand how it happened. Despite this, I have come to terms with the fact that I will face a harsh punishment.

Living with the knowledge that I inadvertently contributed to someone's death is the most horrific thing that has ever happened to me. There isn't a day that goes by that I don't think about it. There are no words to express how deeply I regret what happened.

I have no idea when I will leave prison—but I know I want to leave as a new person and lead a completely different life. That's why I've decided to end the "Tom Swoon" project. It's time to focus on other, more important things than my career. I'm sorry it all ended so suddenly... and so tragically.

— Tom Swoon, 6 June 2018

On 4 September 2018, he was sentenced to four years and eight months in prison, after pleading guilty in court for manslaughter. Swoon also had to pay 280,000 zlotys to the wife and children of the victim, and had his driving license permanently removed. He cited not being able to recall the events prior to the accident, and apologised to the victim's wife for his deeds.

The prosecutor's office appealed against the judgment, considering it too low.

On 22 March 2019, after considering the prosecutor's appeal, the court increased the prison sentence to 5 years and 8 months imprisonment, as the final verdict.

On August 14, 2025, he posted a statement on Instagram under new alias Dorian Numan, saying he is giving himself a second chance in producing music. He is doing livestreams on his new YouTube channel, where he talks about making music and also listen to it with the fans.

== Discography ==
=== Songs ===
- 2017: Beside Me (with Tungevaag & Raaban)
- 2017: Don't Let Me Go (with Wasback and Poli JR)
- 2017: All I Ever Wanted (with Blasterjaxx)
- 2017: Shingaling
- 2017: Helter Skelter (with Maximals)
- 2017: Atom (with Teamworx)
- 2016: All The Way Down (with Kill The Buzz)
- 2016: Never Giving Up
- 2016: Phoenix (We Rise) (with Belle Humble and Dank)
- 2016: I'm Leaving (with Quentin Mosimann featuring Ilang)
- 2015: Stay Together (with Nari & Milani)
- 2015: Alive (with Ale Q and Sonny Noto)
- 2015: Last Goodbye (with Swanky Tunes)
- 2015: Here I Stand (with Kerano featuring Cimo Fränkel)
- 2015: Zulu
- 2015: I Am You (with First State featuring Beth)
- 2014: Savior (featuring Ruby Prophet)
- 2014: Ghost (with Stadiumx featuring Rico & Miella)
- 2014: Wait (with Paris & Simo featuring Eyelar)
- 2014: Holika
- 2014: Otherside (featuring Niclas Lundin)
- 2014: Ahead of Us (with Lush & Simon)
- 2013: Synchronize (with Paris Blohm featuring Hadouken!)
- 2013: Rollercoaster (with Josef Belani)
- 2013: Wings (featuring Taylr Renee)
- 2013: Not Too Late (featuring Amba Shepherd)
- 2012: Who We Are (featuring Miss Palmer)
- 2012: Elva (as Pixel Cheese)

=== Remixes ===
As Tom Swoon

- 2017: Tabitha Nauser – Bulletproof (Tom Swoon Remix)
- 2017: Lorde – Green Light (Tom Swoon Remix)
- 2016: Robert Falcon and Shaan – Mirage (Tom Swoon Remode)
- 2016: Matthew Koma – Kisses Back (Tom Swoon and Indigo Remix)
- 2016: Funkerman – Speed Up (Tom Swoon Remix)
- 2016: Justin Oh – Start Again (Tom Swoon Edit)
- 2016: Kenn Colt featuring Ilang - Sanctify (Tom Swoon and Hiisak Remix)
- 2016: Hiisak - La Fanfarra (Tom Swoon Edit)
- 2016: Djerem – I'm In Love (Tom Swoon Remix)
- 2016: Ale Q and Avedon featuring Jonathan Mendelsohn – Open My Eyes (Tom Swoon Edit)
- 2016: Steve Aoki featuring Matthew Koma – Hysteria (Tom Swoon and Vigel Remix)
- 2016: Sarsa – Zapomnij mi (Tom Swoon Remix)
- 2015: Tom Swoon, Paris & Simo – Wait (Tom Swoon and ak9 Remix)
- 2015: Leona Lewis - Thunder (Tom Swoon Remix)
- 2015: Vigel featuring Laces – Nothing To Lose (Tom Swoon Edit)
- 2015: Dúné vs. Tom Swoon – Last Soldiers (Tom Swoon 'Nightride' Mix)
- 2015: Owl City featuring Aloe Blacc – The Verge (Tom Swoon Remix)
- 2015: Kelly Clarkson – Invincible (Tom Swoon Remix)
- 2015: Five Knives – Savages (Tom Swoon Remix)
- 2015: Kid Arkade featuring Josh Franceschi – Not Alone (Tom Swoon Remix)
- 2014: Krewella – Human (Tom Swoon Remix)
- 2014: Stafford Brothers and Eva Simons – This Girl (Tom Swoon Remix)
- 2014: Jus Jack – Stars (Tom Swoon Remix)
- 2013: Ellie Goulding – Hanging On (Tom Swoon Remix)
- 2013: Linkin Park – Burn It Down (Tom Swoon Remix)
- 2013: Paul Oakenfold – Touched by You (Tom Swoon Remix)
- 2013: Benny Benassi featuring John Legend – Dance the Pain Away (Tom Swoon Remix)
- 2013: Jimmy Carris featuring Polina – Open Your Heart (Tom Swoon Remix)
- 2013: Sultan & Shepard and Nervo featuring Omarion – Army (Tom Swoon Remix)
- 2013: Flo Rida – Let It Roll (Tom Swoon Remix)
- 2013: Gareth Emery and Ashley Wallbridge – DUI (Tom Swoon Remix)
- 2013: Dido – No Freedom (Tom Swoon Remix)
- 2013: Steve Aoki and Angger Dimas vs Dimitri Vegas & Like Mike – Phat Brahms (Tom Swoon Remix)
- 2013: Tara McDonald – Give Me More (Tom Swoon Remix)
- 2013: Bloody Beetroots featuring Greta Svabo Bech – Chronicles of a Fallen Love (Tom Swoon Remix)
- 2013: Avicii - Let Me Show You Love (Tom Swoon Edit)
- 2012: Flo Rida and Jennifer Lopez – Sweet Spot (Tom Swoon Remix)
- 2012: Drumsound & Bassline Smith featuring Hadouken! – Daylight (Tom Swoon Remix)
- 2012: Topher Jones – Hello Chicago (Tom Swoon Remix)
- 2012: Alex Gaudino featuring Taboo – I Don't Wanna Dance (Tom Swoon Remix)

As Pixel Cheese

- 2012: Nervo – You're Gonna Love Again (Pixel Cheese Remix)
- 2012: Qpid – Waterfall (Pixel Cheese Remix)
- 2012: Kaskade feat Skylar Grey – Room for Happiness (Pixel Cheese Remix)
- 2012: Steve Aoki feat Wynter Gordon – Ladi Dadi (Pixel Cheese Remix)
- 2011: Gareth Emery – Tokyo (Pixel Cheese Remix)
- 2011: David Guetta, Avicii and Laidback Luke - Till Sunshine (Pixel Cheese Bootleg)
