= Thunder (Leona Lewis song) =

Single by Leona Lewis

from the album I Am
- Released: 24 July 2015
- Studio: Kite Music (Los Angeles)
- Length: 3:43
- Label: Island; Def Jam
- Songwriters: Leona Lewis; Toby Gad
- Producer: Toby Gad

Leona Lewis singles chronology
| "I Am" (2015) | "Thunder" (2015) | "(We All Are) Looking for Home" (2016) |

Music video
- "Thunder" on YouTube

"Thunder" is a song by British singer and songwriter Leona Lewis from her fifth studio album, I Am (2015). The song was written by Lewis and Toby Gad, who also produced the track. Lyrically, "Thunder" is about finding the strength to pick yourself up after falling on difficult times. Lewis explained that the song is about self-reflection and self-empowerment and finding the ability to look within in order to decide what is best to do next. Def Jam released "Thunder" on 24 July 2015 as the lead single in United States, but it is the third single to be released from the album overall. Remixes by Danny Verde and Tom Swoon were also released.

The track garnered a positive response from music critics, many of whom complimented its powerful and anthemic stance and declared it an album highlight. One critic believed the lyrics to be directed at Simon Cowell, Lewis' former label boss. "Thunder" reached the top thirty on the U.S. Billboard Adult Contemporary and Adult Pop Songs charts, and the top twenty on the Dance Club Songs chart. The song's accompanying music video shows Lewis in a variety of outdoor spaces as clips of varying weather patterns are intercut. She has performed the track on several U.S. television shows, including Good Morning America, The Late Late Show with James Corden and The Talk.

== Background and release ==
"Thunder" was written by Leona Lewis and Toby Gad, with the latter producing the track, for Lewis' fifth studio album, I Am (2015). It was published by ASCAP and Atlas Music publishings (on behalf of itself and Gadfly Songs (ASCAP).) Recorded and mixed by Gad at Kite Music Studios in Los Angeles, Lewis provided all of the vocals for "Thunder" and Gad performed all of the instrumentation and programming. The track's audio was mastered by Tom Coyne at Sterling Sound studios in New York City, with assistance from Randy Merrill. For the acoustic version of "Thunder", Lewis' additional vocals were recorded by Adam Lunn at Wendy House Studios in London. On 30 June 2015, Lewis released a three-minute teaser video with snippets of the title track, "Ladders", and "Power". Media site Idolator exclusively premiered the full length version "Thunder" on 16 July. Lewis told Idolator "'Thunder' is a song that is so close to my heart. I wrote it about the strength of rising after the fall and I'm thankful to be able share it." In an interview for Next Magazine, Lewis further elucidated upon the song's meaning: "It was like coming from a place where you’ve been through a hard situation that has really made you reflect or look deep inside to figure out what it is that you want to do next," said Lewis. "I had that breakthrough where now I feel strong in what I'm doing and strong in my decisions. I'm back and I'm ready to go for it."

The third overall single to be released from I Am following "Fire Under My Feet" and the title track, "Thunder" served as the lead single for the album's release in the United States and was not released in the United Kingdom. It was subsequently released to download digitally in the U.S. on 24 July 2015. Three days later, it was sent to Hot/Modern/Adult contemporary radio stations across the country. A remix of "Thunder" by Danny Verde was released on 11 September 2015, while another by Tom Swoon was later released on 25 September. The Danny Verde remix was also released in Australia, France, Germany, New Zealand and the United Kingdom on 28 September. Despite initial claims that "Thunder" would not be released in the UK, it will be added to BBC Radio 2's C-list playlist on 24 October 2015.

== Composition ==
"Thunder"
A 30-second sample of the song.

Lyrically, "Thunder" is a ballad about finding the "strength of rising after the fall" and follows the self-empowerment theme of the album. The song begins with the lyrics "First it was heaven, ev'rything roses and fire," and she later proclaims "I'm coming back with the thunder." Lewis projects a stance of empowerment as she performs the line "With an empty heart, I am free again" over a "striding" beat accompanied by a piano. Angela Wilson of Vibe described the track as "a celebratory salute to self love" and highlighted the lines "And I won't wait any longer / When you let me down, I got stronger," as empowering. Will Hodgkinson of The Times thought that "Thunder" was about her former record label boss and friend Simon Cowell, writing that the lyrics "I won't wait any longer, when you let me down I got stronger," was Lewis' way of saying "Check me out now, you high-waisted berk." The song, in the key of B major, has a tempo of 92 beats per minute. Lewis' voice spans more than two octaves, from F♯_{3} to G♯_{5}.

== Reception ==
Stephen Thomas Erlewine thought that "Thunder" and "Fire Under My Feet" were some of Lewis's "strongest compositions" to date, and added that they are "sharply crafted and passionate". Digital Spy writer Lewis Corner thought that while Lewis does not appear to have reinvented her sound, her new sense of passion "leads the tried and tested formula with a hefty charge". He listed "Thunder" in his top four tracks to download from I Am, along with "Another Love Song, "Power" and "I Got You". Both Kathy Iandoli and Robbie Daw of Idolator praised "Thunder": the former described the track as "equally anthemic" as "Fire Under My Feet" while the latter wrote that it is a "soulful, soaring ballad" which, as with many of Lewis' songs, is difficult not to get immersed in with its strong emotional sentiment. Knoxville News Sentinel writer Chuck Campbell highlighted it as one of the albums many great tracks, writing "Lewis lassoes the rumbling beat of opener 'Thunder' to announce her return – and she's off from there." Next Magazine writer Benjamin Lindsay picked "Thunder" as a "standout" song on I Am, along with "Fire Under My Feet", "The Essence of Me" and "You Knew Me When". In the United States, "Thunder" peaked at number 29 on the Billboard Adult Contemporary chart for one week. It peaked at number 25 on the Adult Pop Songs chart and spent seven weeks charting, and number 12 on the Dance Club Songs chart. It has also peaked at number 21 in Hungary, number 98 in the Czech Republic and number 100 in Slovakia.

== Promotion ==
During her promotional tour of the U.S., Lewis performed an acoustic version of "Thunder" for B96 Chicago radio station on 15 July 2015. On 13 August, she performed a mini set list for iHeartRadio where she was also interviewed. Lewis started with "Bleeding Love", followed by a cover of Jason Derulo's single "Want to Want Me". For her rendition of "Thunder", the host Kevin Hart bet Lewis $5 to add "Leona Lewis" to the beginning of her performance in the style of how Derulo sings his name on his songs. Lewis obliged, and won the bet. The same day, Lewis released the music video for "Thunder". It shows the singer in various open outdoor spaces as clips of rolling clouds and rays of sunshine are intercut. Vibe writer Angela Wilson described its "simplistic" theme as "the perfect visual for the uplifting track". On 14 September, Lewis performed "Thunder" live on Good Morning America in New York City as part of their Fall Concert Series. Bianca Gracie of Idolator wrote that Lewis performed the track with "her always-stunning vocals". On 21 September, the singer sang the track on The Late Late Show with James Corden. Two days later, Lewis appeared on The Talk where she was interviewed about I Am and once again performed "Thunder". The song was included on her I Am Tour.

== Formats and versions ==
Album versions

- "Thunder" (Album version) – 3:43
- "Thunder" (Acoustic album version) - 3:17

Digital download - Remixes

- "Thunder" (Danny Verde remix) – 5:44
- "Thunder" (Tom Swoon remix) – 3:17

== Personnel ==
Credits sourced from album booklet and liner.

- Leona Lewis – vocals, composer
- Toby Gad – instruments, programming, mixing, composer

== Charts ==
| Chart (2015) | Peak position |
|---|---|
| Canada AC (Billboard) | 44 |
| Czech Republic (Singles Digitál Top 100) | 98 |
| Hungary (Rádiós Top 40) | 18 |
| Slovakia (Singles Digitál Top 100) | 100 |
| US Adult Contemporary (Billboard) | 29 |
| US Adult Pop Airplay (Billboard) | 25 |
| US Dance Club Songs (Billboard) | 12 |

== Release history ==
| Country | Version | Date | Format | Label | Ref. |
|---|---|---|---|---|---|
| United States | Original | 24 July 2015 | Digital download | Def Jam | |
| United States | Original | 27 July 2015 | Hot/Modern/Adult contemporary radio | Def Jam | |
| United States | Danny Verde remix | 11 September 2015 | Digital download | Def Jam | |
| United States | Tom Swoon remix | 25 September 2015 | Digital download | Def Jam | |
| Australia | Danny Verde remix | 28 September 2015 | Digital download | Island | |
| France | Danny Verde remix | 28 September 2015 | Digital download | Island | |
| Germany | Danny Verde remix | 28 September 2015 | Digital download | Island | |
| New Zealand | Danny Verde remix | 28 September 2015 | Digital download | Island | |
| United Kingdom | Danny Verde remix | 28 September 2015 | Digital download | Island | |
| United Kingdom | Original | 24 October 2015 | BBC Radio 2 C-list playlist | Island | |
