= Paris & Simo =

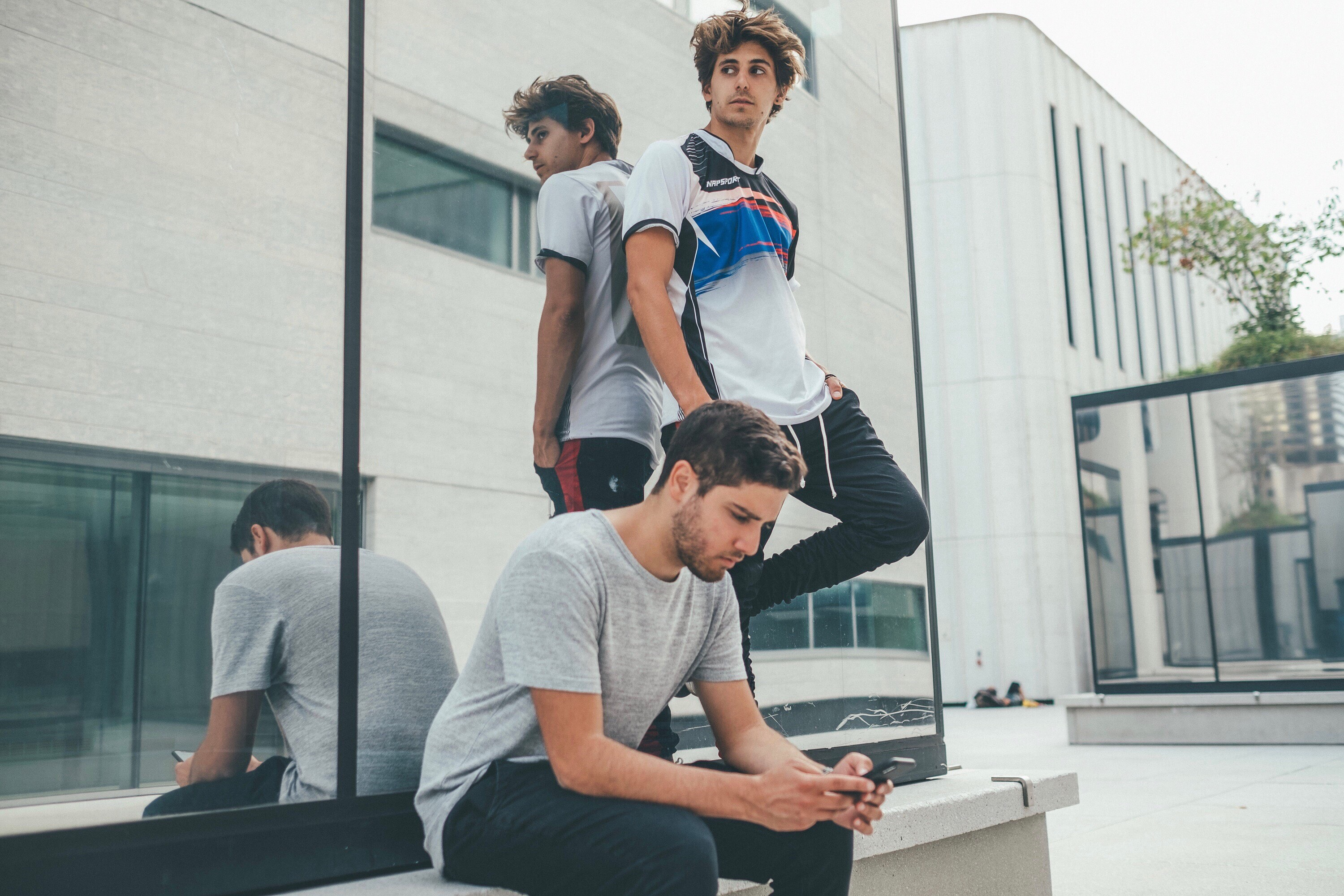

Background information
- Origin: Montreal, Quebec, Canada
- Genres: Big room house; electro house; progressive house; dance-pop
- Years active: 2010—2018
- Labels: Revealed Recordings, Armada Music, Spinnin' Records, Protocol Recordings, Dim Mak Records
- Members: Peiras Fotis; Simone Teti
- Website: www.parisandsimo.com

Paris & Simo, previously known as Paris FZ and Simo T, was a Canadian electronic dance music duo from Montreal, consisting of Peiras "Paris" Fotis-Zoubris (born 1989) and Simone "Simo" Teti (born 1988). Formed in 2010, they performed at Las Vegas' Electric Daisy Carnival, TomorrowWorld, Pier 94 and Guvernment among others. They also toured alongside David Guetta in Canada and frequently performed in various locations such as Japan, Indonesia, Malaysia, South America and others. The group changed their name in 2018, with Paris performing solo as Prince Paris and Simo working only on production.

== Career ==
Paris and Simo were both studying in Montreal in their late teens when they met. Both have European backgrounds (Greek and Italian) and were avid instrumentalists. Musically inclined from a young age, Paris was a drummer while Simo was a piano player, and both were DJs on the side. Together, they created Paris & Simo. Their first taste of success occurred in 2011, when they won a remix contest for Tiesto's "Work Hard Play Hard" single. Armed with a global platform to showcase their musical talent thanks to Tiesto, they started to become known globally. Another dance music artist, Hardwell, took notice and signed them to his Revealed Recordings label. They produced multiple tracks on Hardwell's label, including progressive house songs "Monk", "Nova", "Seasons", "Escape" featuring 3lau and Bright Lights, and "Not Alone" featuring Mako.

Paris & Simo also produced pop-inspired tracks such as "Evermore" featuring Gabrielle Current and FINNEAS, "Keep Me Close" featuring Montreal-based singer Sara Diamond and "Sleep Talk". Their track "Evermore" premiered on Pete Tong's BBC Radio 1.

They both featured in a music video for "Keep Me Close" featured on MUCH, Canada's largest music TV channel.

In October 2018, Paris & Simo announced a change in their public image, with Simo retiring from touring and focusing only on production, and Paris stepping up as the group's frontman. The group's name was changed to Prince Paris, with their first single "My Position" under the new alias being released on 26 October 2018.

== Discography ==
=== Extended plays ===
2011

- Terero (with Steve Mastro)

=== Singles ===
2010

- "Is Love You" (with Mike Casa)

2011

- "Monk"
- "Aura" (with Mark Mendes)

2012

- "Aztec"
- "Nova"

2013

- "Avon"
- "Seasons"
- "Brainfire" (with Ansol)
- "Cairo" (with Charlie Darker)
- "Escape" (with 3lau featuring Bright Lights)
- "Tundra" (with Merk & Kremont)
- "Chaa"

2014

- "Flash" (with Jochen Miller)
- "Silent" (featuring Gabrielle Ross)
- "Wait" (with Tom Swoon)
- "Punk"

2015

- "Eclipse" (with Amersy)
- "Not Alone" (with Mako)
- "Get Back" (with Rico & Miella)
- "Zone"
- "Drop The Pressure" (with Lush & Simon)
- "Here Tonight" (with Jakko)
- "Can You See" (featuring Errol Reid)

2016

- "Lyra" (featuring Misha K)
- "Reunite" (featuring Patrick Moreno and Aloma Steele)
- "Long Way Home" (with Joey Dale featuring Brandon Lehti)
- "Evermore" (featuring Gabrielle Current and Finneas)

2017

- "Keep Me Close" (featuring Sara Diamond)
- "Sleep Talk"
- "Come As You Are" (featuring Karen Harding)

2018

- "Glow" (featuring Nikon)
- "No Lie" (featuring Nikon)
- "Fire Away" (featuring Steve Reece)
- "Let's Chat" (with DLMT featuring Pony)

=== Remixes ===
2010

- Paris FZ and Simo T vs. Calvin Harris — "Black Flashbacks" (Paris FZ and Simo T Bootleg)

2011

- Che Jose (featuring Roxane Lebrasse) — "T.A.R.A.S Song" (Paris FZ and Simo T Remix)
- King Richard and Danny Torrence — "Stupidisco" (Paris FZ and Simo T Remix)
- Peter Brown and Etienne Ozborne — "Change the World" (Paris FZ and Simo T Remix)
- Tiësto (featuring Kay) — "Work Hard, Play Hard" (Paris FZ and Simo T Remix)

2012

- Sultan & Ned Shepard vs. Thomas Sagstad (featuring Dirty Vegas) — "Somebody To Love" (Paris & Simo Remix)
- Usher — "Numb" (Paris & Simo Remix)

2013

- Fenech Soler — "All I Know" (Paris & Simo Remix)
- Jono Fernandez and Pauls Paris (featuring Amba Shepherd) — "Let It Out" (Paris & Simo Remix)
- Silver Sneakerz — "Night & Day" (Paris & Simo Remix)
- Jason Herd and Stafford Brothers (featuring Sherry St Germain) — "Wicked Child" (Paris & Simo Remix)
- Denzal Park (featuring Penelope Austin) — "Animal Heart" (Paris & Simo Remix)

2015

- Cash Cash (featuring Busta Rhymes, B.o.B and Neon Hitch) — "Devil" (Paris & Simo Remix)
- Vice (featuring Estelle) — "Bright Lights" (Paris & Simo Remix)

2016

- Sebastien Benett — "Take Me Away" (Paris & Simo Remix)
- Mako — "Way Back Home" (Paris & Simo Remix)
- Paris & Simo and Lush & Simon — "NY 2 LA" (VIP Mix)

2017

- Benta — "Road with Seven Lanes" (Paris & Simo Remix)
- Paris & Simo (featuring Karen Harding) (Paris & Simo and Aumon Remix)

2018

- Trilane and Yaro — "Dum Dum" (Paris & Simo Remix)
