= Better in Time =

2008 song by Leona Lewis

Single by Leona Lewis

from the album Spirit
- A-side: "Footprints in the Sand"
- B-side: "You Bring Me Down"
- Released: 25 February 2008
- Recorded: 2007
- Studio: Chalice (Los Angeles)
- Genre: Pop; R&B
- Length: 3:53
- Label: Syco; J
- Songwriters: J. R. Rotem; Andrea Martin
- Producer: J. R. Rotem

Leona Lewis singles chronology
"Bleeding Love" (2007)	"Better in Time" / "Footprints in the Sand" (2008)	"Forgive Me" (2008)

Music video
- "Better in Time" on YouTube

"Better in Time" is a song recorded by English singer Leona Lewis for her debut studio album Spirit (2007). It was written by J. R. Rotem and Andrea Martin and produced by Rotem. Lyrically, the song tells the story of a woman who cannot forget her ex-partner but knows that "it will all get better in time". It was released as the second single from Spirit on 25 February 2008. A few days later, on 10 March 2008, Syco Music and J Records launched it as a physical double A-side single with "Footprints in the Sand", and "You Bring Me Down" as the B-side.

Following generally positive reviews from music critics, "Better in Time" was nominated for the Brit Award for British Single. It peaked at number two on the UK Singles Chart, reaching the top ten in Australia, Canada, Germany, Ireland, Italy and New Zealand, as well as eleven in the United States. It received a platinum certifications in Denmark, New Zealand and the UK, and gold certifications in Australia, Germany and Spain.

Lewis promoted "Better in Time" on several live television programmes, such as Good Morning America, Live with Regis and Kelly, and the 2008 American Music Awards. It was also included on the set lists of her concert tours The Labyrinth (2010), Glassheart (2013) and I Am (2016). The song's accompanying music video was directed by Sophie Muller at the Hampton Court House School in London in February 2008, and shows Lewis performing in front of various photographic set-ups and behind-the-scenes events.

== Composition and release ==
"Better in Time"
A sample of "Better in Time", a pop and R&B song composed in G major, which was described as a song with piano sounds harmonised with Lewis' voice.

"Better in Time" is a pop and R&B ballad, written in common time, composed at a moderate tempo of eighty beats per minute, in the key of G flat major, with a vocal range spanning from C_{4} to the note of B_{5}. The song has a sequence of G–Bm–Em–G/D–C as its chord progression. Lyrically the track talks about someone who cannot forget her ex-partner, and at the end the protagonist knows that "it will all get better in time".

Andrea Martin and J. R. Rotem wrote "Better in Time", with Rotem also producing it. In a 2017 interview with American Songwriter, Rotem recalled that he came up with the tune one night, and the following day he composed it in the studio. In another studio session, he met with Martin, who composed the lyrics. He also mentioned the possibility that the song could have been given to Whitney Houston, but Lewis ultimately liked it. He explained that the record label wanted separate versions for American and British radio, leading to fifteen different drum productions.

On 29 January 2008, Lewis announced on her website that "Better in Time", along with "Footprints in the Sand", would be released as a physical double A-side single on 10 March 2008, as her third single in the United Kingdom; however, "Better in Time" was digitally as an individual single on 25 February 2008. That year's Sport Relief, a biennial charity organised by Comic Relief and BBC Sport, selected "Footprints in the Sand" as their official single. It was also her second international single. A new mix of the song was created for the single release. The double A-side was released with "You Bring Me Down" as a B-side.

== Critical reception ==
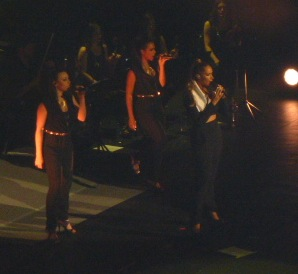
Lewis performing "Better in Time"/"Man Down" at the Royal Albert Hall during her 2013 Glassheart Tour.

"Better in Time" received generally positive reviews. In his Spirit review, Chung Ah-young of The Korea Times described the track as "one of the best tracks [on the album] with impressive piano sounds harmonized with [Lewis's] powerful vocals". Alex Fletcher from Digital Spy gave the double A-side a mixed critique. He called the single a "placid affair" with "its plinky-plonky piano and R&B groove resting uncomfortably next to Lewis's creamy vocal style". The BBC's reviewer Fraser McAlpine gave "Better in Time" three stars out of five commenting that "The tune's quite nice, fairly hummable without ever actually going anywhere and despite the floaty, Mariah-esque qualities of Leona's vocals, it never goes completely mental in the throat-breakdancing department".

Chuck Taylor of Billboard gave a positive assessment, stating that "Better in Time" is of "equal caliber to its predecessor ["Bleeding Love"], with a one-listen hook, elegant chug-along melody, a lyric about healing and Lewis' unquestionably emotive vocal versatility". Nicole Frehsée of Rolling Stone described the vocals as "falsetto-soaked" and "butter-smooth", and compared the lyrics to those of "I Will Survive", by Gloria Gaynor.

Sarah Rodman of The Boston Globe called it a "'love takes time' rumination", and, along with another song of the album ("I Will Be"), described it as "predictable". Sean Fennessey for Vibe noted that the track "is the best thing [on the album], is mannered and takes nearly three minutes to get off the ground". It ranked at number four on the "10 Best Singles of 2008" list by American magazine Entertainment Weekly. Sarah Walters found it strange that the song was selected for the Sport Relief since it has no sport-related lyrics, but described Lewis's vocals as "warbly".

"Better in Time" was nominated at the 2009 BRIT Awards in the category of Best British Single, and was later included on the awards' compilation album.

== Chart performance ==
The double A-side "Better in Time" and "Footprints in the Sand" debuted at number 74 on the UK Singles Chart on 1 March 2008. Rising 36 places, it entered in the top 40 the following week, at number 38. On its fourth week, the song reached its peak position at number two, selling 40,476 copies, though it was kept from the top spot by Duffy's "Mercy". According to Alan Jones of Music Week, releasing both songs as a double A-side contributed to this, as the 7,525 copies sold individually by "Footprints in the Sand" during that week kept the single from surpassing "Mercy". The entry became Lewis's third single to reach the UK top five. The double A-side was certified as platinum by the British Phonographic Industry (BPI).

"Better in Time" and "Footprints in the Sand" debuted in the German charts on 16 June 2008 at number five. Although the single fell out the top ten the following week, in the issue dated 27 July, it returned to the top five, later peaking at number two. The double A-side debuted and peaked at number eight on the European Hot 100 Singles in the issue ending 29 March 2008, becoming the highest debut of the week. Moreover, "Better in Time" also had an individual success in the chart, eventually reached number seven on the chart in the week ending 2 August 2008.

Separately, in Denmark, "Better in Time" entered the charts at number twenty-nine on 9 May 2008, and managed to rise twenty-three places in the next two weeks, peaking at number three on 6 June 2008. It briefly slipped two places the following week, but returned to number three, where it stayed for three weeks. Later the International Federation of the Phonographic Industry (IFPI) certified the single as gold. The song also debuted at number 34 on New Zealand's RIANZ Chart on 17 March 2008, eventually reaching number nine after five weeks, and by its seventh week had climbed to number six, thereby becoming her second consecutive top ten hit in the country. In the Australian charts, it debuted at number 32 on 27 April 2008, reaching the top ten two weeks later, her second single to secure the top ten. On 25 May 2008 "Better in Time" reached its peak position, at number six, and remained within the top fifty for eighteen weeks. It was later certified gold by the Australian Recording Industry Association (ARIA). In Switzerland, the track debuted at number thirteen as the week's highest new entry. On 27 July 2008, its ninth week, it reached its peak position at number five, becoming Lewis's second top-five hit in the country. It remained in the top ten for eleven weeks and last appeared on the chart on 22 March 2009, forty-two weeks after its debut.

In the week ending 26 April 2008, "Better in Time" debuted at number sixty-two on the Billboard Hot 100, in the same week that her previous single, "Bleeding Love", topped the chart. Next week it dropped out of the chart but later re-entered the Hot 100 at number seventy-five, becoming the best comeback of the week. The single peaked at number eleven in its fourteenth week, remaining there for a second week. In other US charts, "Better in Time" peaked at number four on the Adult Top 40, ninety-nine on the Hot R&B/Hip-Hop Songs, number three on the Mainstream Top 40, and at number four on the Adult Contemporary, where it spent fifty-two weeks. The song entered the German chart on 22 February 2009 at number seventy-nine, where it stayed for three weeks. It achieved a gold certification by the Bundesverband Musikindustrie (BVMI).

"Better in Time" became the seventeenth best-selling single of 2008 in Austria, the twenty-second in Germany and Switzerland, the thirty-sixth in New Zealand, the thirty-seventh in the UK, the fifty-fifth of Australia, the sixty-fourth in the Netherlands, and the seventy-second in Flanders, a region in Belgium.

== Music video and promotion ==
The music video shows Lewis performing in front of several photo shoots.

The music video, directed by British filmmaker Sophie Muller, was filmed in February 2008, at the Hampton Court House, an 18th-century building and private day school, located at the edge of Bushy Park in London, and was released on 29 February 2008. The video is inspired by fashion design, with Lewis performing in front of "unrelated photographic set-ups" while also showing what goes on behind the scenes. At certain points, Lewis appears alongside a horse.

Lewis has performed the song on several television programmes and live events. She initially performed it on the third series of Dancing on Ice on 9 March 2008, and performed both tracks of the double A-side on Sport Relief on 14 March. In the U.S., she promoted the single on Good Morning America on 4 April 2008, and on the Jimmy Kimmel Live!, where she also sang "Bleeding Love". Later that year, she performed it on Live with Regis and Kelly on 3 September, during the third season finale of America's Got Talent, and at the 2008 American Music Awards.

In 2011, Lewis performed a reggae-styled mashup of "Better in Time" and Rihanna's "Man Down" for BBC Radio 1's Live Lounge, and the original version was included on the charity compilation Songs for Japan, released on 25 March 2011 in response to the Tōhoku earthquake and tsunami. The song was later used in the Pretty Little Liars season two finale "unmAsked", during the masquerade ball scene.

Lewis added "Better in Time" to the setlist of her Labyrinth Tour in 2010, where it was performed fourth in the show. The performance was included on the live album and Blu-ray The Labyrinth Tour: Live from the O2, released on 29 November 2010. In 2013, Lewis revived the mashup with "Man Down" for her Glassheart Tour. She has added the song to the setlist of her 2016 I Am Tour.

== Track listings and formats ==
Australian Maxi single and UK Sport Relief CD single

1. "Better in Time" – 3:55
2. "Footprints in the Sand" – 4:09
3. "You Bring Me Down" – 3:54

CD single (Syco), CD single (RCA), Maxi single, and Swiss CD single

1. "Better in Time" (Single Mix) – 3:55
2. "Footprints in the Sand" (Single Mix) – 3:58

German Premium single

1. "Better in Time" (Single Mix) – 3:55
2. "Footprints in the Sand" (Single Mix) – 3:58
3. "Bleeding Love" (Moto Blanco Remix Radio Edit) – 3:40
4. "Better in Time" (Video) – 3:58

Sony single; Swiss Maxi single

1. "Better in Time" (Single Mix) – 3:55
2. "Footprints in the Sand" (Single Mix) – 3:58
3. "Bleeding Love" (Moto Blanco Remix Radio Edit) – 3:40

== Credits and personnel ==
"Better in Time"

- Leona Lewis – vocals
- J. R. Rotem – instruments, musical arranger, writer and producer
- Greg Ogan – recorder
- Andrea Martin – writer
- Vlado Meller – mastering
- Serban Ghenea – mixer
- Lyndell Fraser – Pro–tools engineer
- Tim Roberts – Pro–tools engineer assistant

"You Bring Me Down"

- Leona Lewis – vocals, writer
- Salaam Remi – bass, piano, drums, writer
- Vincent Henry – saxophone, flute, clarinet
- Bruce Purse – trumpet, bass trumpet, flugelhorn
- Vlado Meller – mastering
- Manny Marroquin – mixer
- Taj Jackson – vocal producer, writer
- Gleyder "Gee" Disla – recorder
- Franklin "Esoses" Socorro – recorder

== Charts ==
=== Weekly charts ===
Weekly chart performance
Chart (2008–2014)	Peak position
Australia (ARIA)	6
Austria (Ö3 Austria Top 40)	3
Belgium (Ultratop 50 Flanders)	12
Belgium (Ultratop 50 Wallonia)	12
Canada Hot 100 (Billboard)	9
Canada AC (Billboard)	2
Canada CHR/Top 40 (Billboard)	5
Canada Hot AC (Billboard)	5
CIS Airplay (TopHit)	150
Czech Republic (Rádio – Top 100)	3
Denmark (Tracklisten)	3
European Hot 100 Singles (Billboard)	7
European Hot 100 Singles (Billboard) with "Footprints in the Sand"	8
Finland (Suomen virallinen lista)	13
France (SNEP) Download Charts	16
Germany (Official German Charts)	79
Germany (Official German Charts) with "Footprints in the Sand"	2
Germany Airplay (Official German Charts)	1
Hungary (Editors' Choice Top 40)	8
Ireland (IRMA)	4
Italy (FIMI)	4
Japan Hot 100 (Billboard)	16
Mexico Anglo (Monitor Latino)	5
Netherlands (Dutch Top 40)	13
Netherlands (Single Top 100)	21
New Zealand (Recorded Music NZ)	6
Norway (VG-lista)	19
Poland (Polish Airplay Chart)	3
Romania (Romanian Top 100)	9
Russia Airplay (TopHit)	28
Scottish Singles Sales (Official Charts) with "Footprints in the Sand"	1
Slovakia (Rádio Top 100)	5
South Korea International (Gaon)	56
Spain (Promusicae)	14
Sweden (Sverigetopplistan)	5
Switzerland (Schweizer Hitparade)	5
UK Singles (Official Charts) with "Footprints in the Sand"	2
US Billboard Hot 100	11
US Adult Contemporary (Billboard)	4
US Adult Pop Airplay (Billboard)	6
US Hot R&B/Hip-Hop Songs (Billboard)	99
US Pop Airplay (Billboard)	3

=== Year-end charts ===
Year-end chart performance
Chart (2008)	Position
Australia (ARIA)	55
Austria (Ö3 Austria Top 40)	17
Belgium (Ultratop 50 Flanders)	72
Belgium (Ultratop 50 Wallonia)	93
Canada (Canadian Hot 100)	48
Croatia International Airplay (HRT)	7
European Hot 100 Singles (Billboard)	59
Germany (Media Control GfK)	22
Netherlands (Dutch Top 40)	64
New Zealand (RIANZ)	36
Portugal (AFP)	13
Russia Airplay (TopHit)	128
Sweden (Sverigetopplistan)	45
Switzerland (Schweizer Hitparade)	22
UK Singles (OCC) with "Footprints in the Sand"	37
US Billboard Hot 100	53
US Mainstream Top 40 (Billboard)	25

Chart (2009)	Position
Canada (Canadian Hot 100)	96
Russia Airplay (TopHit)	157
US Adult Contemporary (Billboard)	3
US Adult Top 40 (Billboard)	40
US Radio Songs (Billboard)	99

== Certifications ==
Certifications and sales for "Better in Time"
Region	Certification	Certified units/sales
Australia (ARIA)	Gold	35,000^{^}
Denmark (IFPI Danmark)	Platinum	15,000^{^}
Germany (BVMI)	Gold	150,000^{^}
Italy	—	56,405
New Zealand (RMNZ)	Platinum	30,000^{‡}
Spain (Promusicae)	Gold	10,000^{*}
United Kingdom (BPI) with "Footprints in the Sand"	Platinum	600,000^{‡}
^{*} Sales figures based on certification alone.^{^} Shipments figures based on certification alone.^{‡} Sales+streaming figures based on certification alone.

== Release history ==
Release dates and formats for "Better in Time"
Region	Date	Format(s)	Label(s)	Ref.
United Kingdom	25 February 2008	Digital download	Syco	
United Kingdom	9 March 2008	Digital download (EP)	Syco	
United Kingdom	10 March 2008	Maxi CD	Syco	
Australia	19 April 2008	CD	Sony BMG	
Germany	9 May 2008	Digital download	Ariola	
Switzerland	16 May 2008	Maxi CD	Sony BMG	
Switzerland	23 May 2008	CD	Sony BMG	
Germany	30 May 2008	CD; maxi CD	Ariola	
Australia	5 July 2008	Digital download (EP); maxi CD	Sony BMG	
United States	15 July 2008	Contemporary hit radio	J; RCA	

== Bibliography ==
- Lewis, Leona (2008). Leona Lewis Spirit. United Kingdom: Hal Leonard. ISBN 978-1-4234-4568-5.
