= I Will Be (song) =

Single by Leona Lewis

from the album Spirit
- Released: 6 January 2009
- Recorded: 2007
- Studio: Conway Recording Studios (Los Angeles, CA); Henson Recording Studios (Los Angeles, CA); Opra Music (Los Angeles, CA); Ocean Way Recording (Los Angeles, CA); Dr. Luke's studio (New York, NY); Atlantic Studios (Stockholm, Sweden); Sarm West Studios (Stockholm, Sweden)
- Genre: Pop rock
- Length: 3:58
- Label: Syco; J
- Songwriters: Avril Lavigne; Max Martin; Lukasz Gottwald
- Producer: Dr. Luke

Leona Lewis singles chronology
"Run" (2008)	"I Will Be" (2009)	"Happy" (2009)

Music video
- "I Will Be" on YouTube

Audio sample
- "I Will Be": file; help

"I Will Be" is a song written and originally recorded by Canadian singer Avril Lavigne for her third studio album The Best Damn Thing (2007). It appeared on select editions of the album as a bonus track before English singer Leona Lewis covered it for her debut studio album Spirit (2007). Max Martin and Lukasz Gottwald co-wrote the song, whilst production was helmed by Gottwald under his production name Dr. Luke. It is a piano and guitar-led ballad. The song was sent to contemporary hit radio as the fourth US single, and seventh and final single from Spirit on January 6, 2009, by J Records.

"I Will Be" garnered mixed reception from music critics, with some praising Lewis' vocal performance, whilst others described it as emotionless. Upon the release of Spirit in November 2007, the song peaked at number 160 on the UK Singles Chart due to strong digital download sales, but failed to attain a higher peak due to not being released as a single in the United Kingdom. However, it peaked at number 66 on the US Billboard Hot 100. An accompanying music video for the song was filmed in New York City and featured Chace Crawford as Lewis' love interest. Lewis performed the song live on the Late Show with David Letterman.

== Production and recording ==
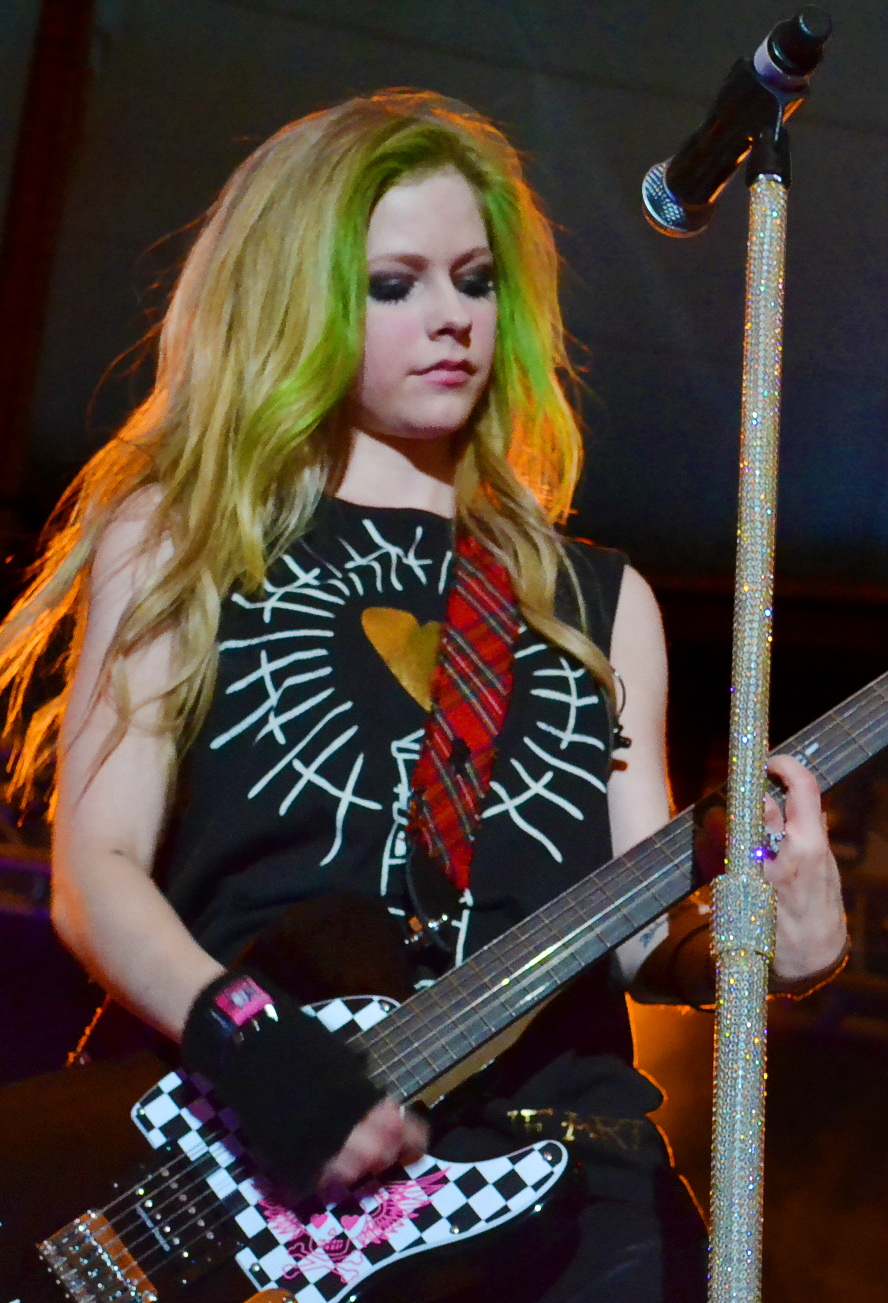
Avril Lavigne co-wrote and originally performed the song.

"I Will Be" was written by Avril Lavigne, Max Martin, Lukasz "Dr. Luke" Gottwald; it was produced by Dr. Luke, and was co-produced by Steven Wolf and Max Beckley and Smit. Lavigne originally performed the song, which was included on her third studio album The Best Damn Thing, released in April 2007, included on the bonus track edition. In the same year, Leona Lewis covered the song for her debut album Spirit, utilizing the same instrumental as Lavigne's version. Lewis's version was recorded at multiple recording studios around the world, including Conway Recording Studios and Westlake Recording Studios, in Los Angeles, California; Henson Recording Studios, Opra Music, and Ocean Way Recording, all located in Hollywood, California; Dr. Luke's personal recording studio in New York City; Atlantic Studios, Stockholm, Sweden; Sarm West, London, England. The production coordinators were Gary "The Shredder" Silver and Emily Wright.

A multitude of engineers were involved with the process of recording the song, including Doug McKean, Rob Smith, Seth Waldmann, Keith Gretlin, Josh Wilbur, Tom Syrowski, Tatiana Gottwald, Chris Soper, Sam Holland, Chris Holmes, Rouble Kapoor, Wesley Seidman, Janne Hansson, Emily Wright, Marcus Dextegen and Sam Cross. "I Will Be" was mixed by Chris Lord-Alge at Resonale Recording Studios, Burbank, CA, and was assisted by Keith Armstrong and Nik Karpen. For the instrumental, Leon Pendarvis was the conductor and arranger; Martin provided piano, Dr. Luke provided the electric guitar and Yamaha Acoustic guitar, Jack Daley provided the bass and Wolf provided the drums and percussion.

== Composition ==
"I Will Be" is a piano and guitar led pop rock song, which lasts for a duration of 3 minutes, 58 seconds. The song was composed in the key of G major using common time and a slow groove at 72 beats per minute. Lewis's vocal range spans two octaves, from the low note of B_{3} to the high note of B_{5}, on the song. The song opens with the lyrics, "There's nothing I could say to you, nothing I could ever do to make you see what you mean to me." Chad Grischow for IGN described the song's piano led instrumental to be "overblown", but noted that Lewis has enough "vocal strength to prevent her from being overshadowed by the drowningly lush sound." Eric R. Danton wrote on his review of Spirit for the Hartford Courant daily that "I Will Be" begins with a "spare piano introduction" that "blossoms into an arrangement buoyed by strings and then drums and guitar". Danton described Lewis's vocals as "delicate" and that "take flight on the chorus".

== Response ==
=== Critical reception ===
The song garnered a mixed response from music critics. Nate Chinen for The New York Times was complimentary of Lewis's cover, and praised her "powerhouse vocals". Matt O'Leary for Virgin Media wrote that Lewis's rendition of the song was "epic", and that when the production is kept minimal, "her uniqueness is allowed to shine." Although Sarah Rodman for The Boston Globe described the song as "predictable", she praised Lewis's ability to sing with "believable pathos" and hit clean notes. Sal Cinquemani for Slant Magazine was also critical of the song, writing that it is "dangerously middle-of-the-road." Danton from the Hartford Courant considered the song as "ready-made for awards shows or emotional on-screen montages." He concluded that "I Will Be" is a "powerful stuff, and it would make for a gem of a pop record if it kept up."

=== Chart performance ===
Upon the release of Spirit in the United Kingdom, "I Will Be" debuted and peaked at number 160 on the UK Singles Chart from digital download sales. Upon its release as a single in January 2009 in the United States, "I Will Be" debuted on the US Pop Songs chart at number 34 on 31 January 2009. In its second week, it rose to number 31, and again to number 28 in its third week. It peaked at number 24 and remained on the chart for eight weeks. In its seventh and eighth weeks, it charted at numbers 25 and 31, respectively. It debuted on the US Billboard Hot 100 at number 94 on 14 February 2009. It peaked at number 66, and exited the chart at number 80. The song debuted on the US Adult Pop Songs chart at number 39 on 7 March 2009, and rose to number 34 the following week. In its third and fourth weeks, the song charted at numbers 33 and 25, respectively. "I Will Be" peaked at number 23 in its fifth week on the chart, and fell to number 24 the following week. It also debuted at number 65 on the US Hot Digital Songs chart on 21 February 2009, which was also its peak. In Canada, the song entered the chart at number 86, and peaked at number 83.

== Music video ==
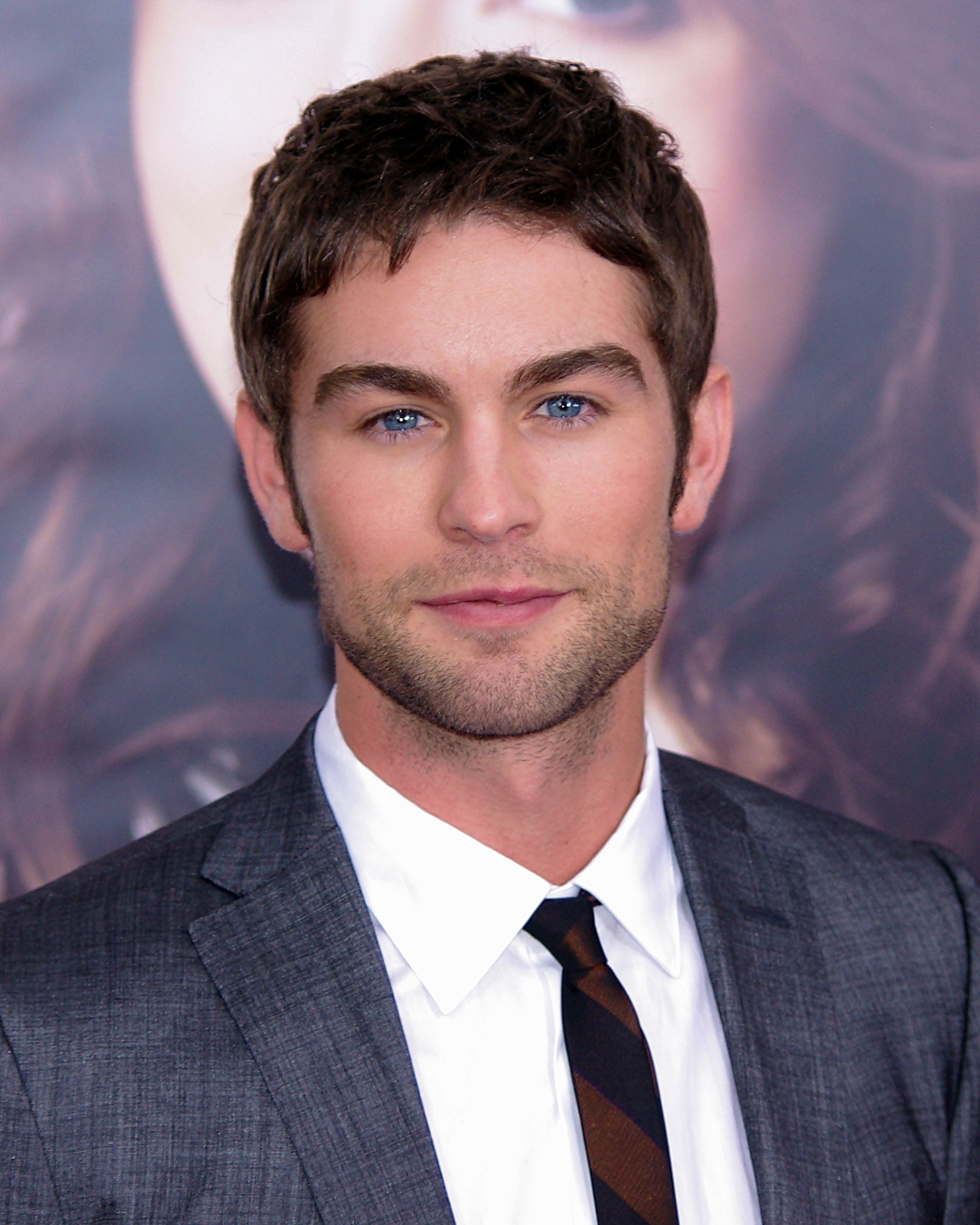
Gossip Girl actor Chace Crawford appears as Lewis' love interest and partner in crime in the music video.

The music video for "I Will Be" was shot in New York City on 18 December 2008, and features Gossip Girl actor Chace Crawford as one of the characters. A reporter for People explained how the inclusion of Crawford in the video came to fruition, writing that "Chace went to London a couple months ago for meetings and to promote Gossip Girl. He went to a party and ended up meeting Leona. [They] hit it off and talk every once in a while and have become fast friends. A couple weeks ago Leona called Chace and asked if he would be in her next video. He obviously said yes." In the video, it is presumed that Lewis and Crawford have stolen a large amount of money, as it opens with dialogue between the pair and how they are going to try and arrange to meet each other at a later date, due to the police closing in on them. As the song begins to play, Lewis sings the first verse on the car bonnet in which they were shown sitting in previously. As she sings the first chorus, she stands up and faces Crawford in the car, and begins to walk away in a car park as she sings the second verse. For the second chorus, Lewis is shown to evade the police by trying to escape by car park stairways, but is confronted by policemen wherever she goes. For the final chorus, Lewis makes it out onto the road and runs from the police in their cars, but is ultimately blocked from escape in all directions as they close in on her, arrest her, and place her in the back of a police car. People ranked the video as one of the most anticipated videos to be released in January 2009.

== Live performances ==
On 20 January 2009, Lewis performed the song on the Late Show with David Letterman.

== Credits and personnel ==
Recording

- Recorded at Conway Recording Studios, Los Angeles, CA; Henson Recording Studios, Hollywood, CA; Dr. Luke's, NYC; Opra Music, Hollywood CA; Ocean Way Recording, Hollywood, CA; Westlake Recording Studios, Los Angeles, CA; Atlantic Studios, Stockholm, Sweden; Sarm West, London, England.
- Mixed at Resonale Studios, Burbank, CA.

Personnel

- Songwriting – Avril Lavigne, Max Martin, Lukasz Gottwald
- Production – Dr. Luke
- Co-production – Steven Wolf, Max Beckley and Smit
- Production coordinators – Gary "The Shredder" Silver, Emily Wright
- Engineers – Doug McKean, Rob Smith, Seth Waldmann, Keith Gretlin, Josh Wilbur, Tom Syrowski, Tatiana Gottwald, Chris Soper, Sam Holland, Chris Holmes, Rouble Kapoor, Wesley Seidman, Janne Hansson, Emily Wright, Marcus Dextegen, Sam Cross
- Mixing – Chris Lord-Alge
- Assistant mixing – Keith Armstrong, Nik Karpen
- Conductor and Arranger – Leon Pendarvis
- Piano – Max Martin
- Electric Guitars, Yamaha Acoustic Guitar – Dr. Luke
- Bass – Jack Daley
- Drums and percussion – Steven Wolf

Credits adapted from the liner notes of Spirit, Syco Music, J Records, Sony Music.

== Charts ==
Weekly chart performance for "I Will Be"
Chart (2007–2009)	Peak position
Canada (Canadian Hot 100)	83
Canada Hot AC (Billboard)	44
CIS Airplay (TopHit)	193
UK Singles (OCC)	160
US Billboard Hot 100	66
US Adult Pop Airplay (Billboard)	23
US Pop Airplay (Billboard)	24

== Release history ==
Release dates and formats for "I Will Be"
Region	Date	Format(s)	Label(s)	Ref.
United States	6 January 2009	Contemporary hit radio	J	
United States	26 February 2009	Digital download	J	
