= I Am (Leona Lewis album) =

Studio album by Leona Lewis
- Released: 11 September 2015
- Recorded: 2013–2015
- Studios: Kensaltown Studios (London, UK); Wendyhouse Studios (London, UK); Kite Music Studios (Los Angeles, CA)
- Genre: R&B
- Length: 35:35
- Labels: Island; Def Jam
- Producers: Kevin Anyaeji; James Eliot; Toby Gad; TMS; Eg White; Wayne Wilkins

Leona Lewis chronology
Christmas, with Love (2013)	I Am (2015)

Singles from I Am
- 1. "Fire Under My Feet" Released: 7 June 2015; 2. "I Am" Released: 17 July 2015; 3. "Thunder" Released: 24 July 2015

I Am is the fifth studio album by English singer Leona Lewis. It was released on 11 September 2015, by Island Records after Lewis took leave from Syco Music in June 2014. Recording began in mid 2013, during the production of Lewis's first Christmas album and fourth studio album, Christmas, with Love (2013). Recording sessions resumed in January 2014 with producer Poet, Toby Gad and Wayne Wilkins. I Am is preceded by the release of "Fire Under My Feet" and the album's title track except for in the United States where "Thunder" precedes the album. The album reached top 40 in multiple countries, including US, United Kingdom, Spain and Germany.

== Background ==
In February 2013, a representative from Syco Music, Lewis' record label, announced that she was about to start writing and recording material "imminently" for her fourth studio album, and that it would be released in late 2013. The news came after Lewis announced that she had parted ways from Modest! Management, the management team who had represented her since she won the third series of The X Factor in 2006. Various media outlets speculated that this was due to the weak commercial performance of her third studio album, Glassheart, which was released in November 2012. It became her first album to not debut at number one or earn platinum certification in the United Kingdom. In August 2013, Lewis confirmed that she was in the process of recording her first Christmas album, and that label boss and friend, Simon Cowell, came up with the idea. Lewis released Christmas, with Love in November 2013; it peaked at number 13 on the UK Albums Chart and was certified gold by the British Phonographic Industry (BPI) on 27 December 2013, denoting shipments of more than 100,000 copies.

== Development ==
On 23 September 2013, it was announced that Lewis would make her acting debut in Walking on Sunshine, a 1980s-inspired musical film. In an interview with Digital Spy on 27 November 2013, Lewis confirmed that she would begin official recording sessions for her fifth studio album in January 2014, after she had finished promoting Christmas, with Love. She revealed that during the production of Christmas, with Love in Summer 2013, she had met with some producers to conceptualise a theme for the album, but that the main focus at the time was to compose songs for the Christmas album. With regard to style and composition, Lewis said that 2013 allowed her to become re-inspired; she stated that after recording songs for Walking on Sunshine, she wanted the album to have a 1980s sound. Later, however, after she recorded Motown inspired songs for the Christmas album, it allowed her to "just get out of [her] head and go into something completely different", stating that she is now leaning towards a "retro throwback sound" as a possible theme for the album.

On 3 June 2014, it was announced that Lewis had parted ways with her record label of seven years, Syco Music. Label boss and mentor Simon Cowell tweeted: "Congratulations Leona. We had 7 great years together and now wish you all the best for the future. You put X Factor on the map." Lewis confirmed that she had signed a new contract in the United Kingdom with rival record company Island Records, a division of the Universal Music Group. On joining the label, Lewis said: "After seven incredible years at Sony I feel honoured to be given the opportunity to sign to perhaps the most iconic label of all, Island Records." Lewis later revealed that her departure from Syco had come after "several years" of consideration. She also stated that when she expressed her desire to part with the label she was threatened that the public would be told she had been dropped by the label. However, further creative differences in relation to her fifth studio album finally caused Lewis to leave the label. Of her departure, she stated:

I was asked to make a record that would not have been true to myself. By all means as an artist in this climate, I was thankful to even get the chance to make another record. But I cannot make music that does not speak to my soul, and as scary as it seemed, I could no longer compromise myself, and so I decided to leave.

== Recording ==
On 27 November 2013, Lewis stated that, during the production of Christmas, With Love in the Summer of 2013, she met with a couple of producers to conceptualize a theme for the album. She confirmed that official recording sessions for the album would begin in January 2014. She also stated that she recently "reached out" to a couple of different songwriters and producers and expressed her desire to work with Bruno Mars and his frequent collaborators, The Smeezingtons. On 19 December 2013, Lewis confirmed that she had recorded a couple of songs with Poet, who has produced material for the Black Eyed Peas, as well as some other unnamed producers. She stated her intentions of going back into the studio with Poet. On 30 August 2014, Lewis revealed that she had spent the week in the studio working with Jesse Shatkin, who co-wrote "Chandelier" for Australian singer-songwriter Sia. On 10 September, Diane Warren confirmed that she and Lewis would be working together.

== Release and promotion ==
Promotion for I Am began on 19 December 2014 when Lewis posted a short clip of her performing "Fire Under My Feet" and playing the piano, while a member of her band played the drums. On 12 February 2015; Lewis uploaded a video on YouTube that showed her recording the song in the studio. Four days later, another video was uploaded, showing Lewis recording several other songs from the album. On 14 April 2015, Def Jam hosted an album showcase listening party for I Am during which Lewis performed five songs from the album for the first time including "Fire Under My Feet", the title track "I Am", "I Got You", "Ladders", and "Thank You". Two days later, the artwork for the standard edition of the album was revealed. On 21 April 2015 a new video was uploaded via Lewis' official YouTube account; it documents the recording process of "Fire Under My Feet". It also showed the photoshoot that took place for both the single and the album, while a snippet of "Fire Under My Feet" was also played during the video. On 13 June 2015 Lewis performed "I Got You" and "Another Love Song" at the London G-A-Y nightclub. The same day, she premiered "Essence of Me" at BBC Radio 2.

The track list for the standard and deluxe edition were first revealed by Amazon.co.uk on 24 June 2015, while artwork for the deluxe edition was unveiled the following day. On 26 June 2015 Universal Music placed pre-orders for I Am on their official website. On 27 June 2015, the album was made available for pre-order on iTunes. On 13 August 2015; "Another Love Song" was made available for purchase as a promotional single at several digital retailers, such as iTunes and 7digital. "Power" was released as a promotional single in Germany on 28 August 2015. It was later made available in all other countries on 4 September 2015. The studio versions of "I Got You" and "Ladders" were premièred in full at BBC Radio 2 on 1 to 3 September 2015, respectively.

=== I Am Tour ===
On 11 September 2015, Leona announced her third headlining concert tour, the I Am Tour, to support the album, with an initial run of fourteen dates in Great Britain.

=== Singles ===
The album's lead single, "Fire Under My Feet", was released on 7 June 2015. Written by Lewis and Toby Gad, the track peaked at number 51 on the UK Singles Chart following its release. In addition, it peaked at number 4 on the Billboard 100 Hot Dance charts. "I Am" was released to the iTunes Store in the UK on 17 July 2015 as the second single in the UK. "Thunder" was released as the third official single from I Am on 24 July 2015; it also served as the lead release from the album in US markets. It impacted US adult contemporary radio on 27 July 2015. "Thunder" was released as the third single in the UK; it officially impacted UK radio on 24 October 2015.

== Critical reception ==
Professional ratings
Review scores
Source	Rating
AllMusic	4/5 stars
Digital Spy	4/5 stars
Exclaim!	5/10
Idolator	3.5/5 stars
Knoxville News Sentinel	3.5/5 stars
London Evening Standard	2/5 stars

Writing for AllMusic, Stephen Thomas Erlewine gave the album four out of five stars, writing "Lewis seizes this fourth album to redefine her sound [throwing] herself into a buoyant bounce somewhat inspired by reigning British diva, Adele....The songs [on the album] are passionate and sharply crafted [...] resulting in her strongest compositions......and her best album yet". Digital Spy author Lewis Corner found that "for all intents and purposes, I Am is Leona's break-up album. Having worked closely with Toby Gad, she has created a concentrated record with a solid voice throughout that positions her as songwriter with something to say. The mixture of both Leona's frustration and determination leave her more vulnerable than we've heard her before, but ultimately she comes through stronger than ever. Leona's got a different kind of Ex-Factor this time out, and it's working wonders."

Chuck Campbell from Knoxville News Sentinel noted that "Lewis sounds great on her new I Am, but the release is still something of a disappointment. Trouble is, it feels a bit obvious, and therefore a little hollow." He added that "Lewis sounds gutsy, as she always does, the production is crisp and the hooks are sharp – so there's no need for excessive complaining. It's just this phoenix-rising tale has been done to death, and her return is only a qualified triumph." Idolator's Kathy Iandoli wrote that while "the 10-track offering is full of beautiful music, it would be remiss to suggest I Am is full of hits. And that's where Leona's voice becomes an impediment." She felt that "I Am may be slightly flawed by design, but there are still many 'yaaasssss' moments, enough to make you hope her next go 'round doesn't take as long." Less enthusiastic, London Evening Standard writer John Aizlewood felt that "I Am will doubtless be billed as a new start but it feels like an ending. [It] is defiantly more of the same and [Lewis is] as cautious as a learner driver on test day. Tinny, timid production makes I Am sound like it was recorded at home but Lewis's vocals are still anodyne cruise-ship fare and she still mistakes caterwauling for emotion."

== Commercial performance ==
Upon its chart debut, I Am debuted at number 12 on the UK Albums Chart and number 8 on the UK Album Download Chart. I Am debuted at number 38 on the US Billboard 200 Album Chart with 9,000 copies sold, Lewis' third album to peak in the US top 40. I Am also peaked at number 11 in Scotland, also charting within the top 40 in Ireland, Germany, Austria, Spain and Switzerland.

== Track listing ==
Album track listing and credits sourced from album booklet and liner.

I Am
No.	Title	Writer(s)	Producer(s)	Length
1.	"Thunder"	Leona Lewis; Toby Gad	Gad	3:43
2.	"Fire Under My Feet"	Lewis; Gad	Gad	3:35
3.	"You Knew Me When"	Diane Warren	Gad	3:40
4.	"I Am"	Lewis; Gad; Francis White	Gad; White	3:42
5.	"Ladders"	Lewis; Anne Preven; Wayne Wilkins; Kevin Anyaeji	Wilkins; Anyaeji	3:26
6.	"The Essence of Me"	Lewis; Gad	Gad	3:41
7.	"I Got You"	Lewis; Gad	Gad	3:01
8.	"Power"	Lewis; Gad; James Eliot	Eliot; Gad^{[a]}	3:19
9.	"Another Love Song"	Lewis; Gad; Ben Kohn; Tom Barnes; Pete Kelleher	Gad; TMS; Jaded^{[b]}	3:26
10.	"Thank You"	Lewis; Gad; Preven	Gad	4:02
Total length:				35:35

I Am – Deluxe edition
No.	Title	Writer(s)	Producer(s)	Length
11.	"Thick Skin"	Lewis; Gad	Gad	2:58
12.	"The Best and the Worst"	Lewis; Gad; Shahid Khan; Jonny Coffer	Gad^{[c]}; Naughty Boy^{[c]}	3:24
13.	"I Am" (Acoustic)	Lewis; Gad; White	Gad; White	3:26
14.	"Thunder" (Acoustic)	Lewis; Gad	Gad	3:17
15.	"Fire Under My Feet" (United Studios Sessions)	Lewis; Gad	Gad	3:43
Total length:				52:23

I Am Japanese edition bonus track
No.	Title	Writer(s)	Producer(s)	Length
16.	"Fire Under My Feet" (Endor Remix)	Lewis; Gad	Endor	3:33
Total length:				55:56

Notes

- ^{^[a]} signifies additional vocal production
- ^{^[b]} signifies additional production
- ^{^[c]} signifies co-producer

== Personnel and credits ==
All credits and personnel sourced and adapted from album booklet.

=== Performers ===
- Leona Lewis – lead vocal
- Phebe Edwards – backing vocals (track 15)
- Kelli-Leigh Henry-Davila – backing vocals (track 12)
- Sabrina Ramikie – backing vocals (track 15)

=== Technical staff and musicians ===
- Kevin Anyaeji – programming (keyboards), producer
- Jon Bailey – recording engineer
- Max Baillie – violin
- Lizzie Ball – violin
- Dick Beetham – mastering
- Ann Beilby – viola
- James Boyd – viola
- Jamie Cambell – violin
- Edwin Carranza – recording engineer (drums, horns)
- Meghan Cassidy – viola
- Ben Chappell – cello
- Wez Clarke – mixing
- Darek Cobbs – drums
- David Cohen – cello
- Tom Coyne – mastering
- Hannah Dawson – violin
- James "Jim" Eliot – instruments, mixing, producer
- Clarissa Farran – strings arrangement, conductor, transcription (strings)
- Toby Gad – mixing, instruments, programming, additional mixing, producer
- Janice Graham – leader, violins
- Richard Harwood – cello
- Martyn Jackson – violin
- Jaded – producer (additional)
- Marjie Johnston – violin
- Beatrix "Bea" Lovejoy – violin
- Kristian Larsen – recording engineer (strings)
- Adam Lunn – recording engineer (vocals, additional vocals)
- Ciaran McCabe – violin
- Lewey Melchor – engineer
- Randy Merrill – mastering
- Adam Miller – assistant recording engineer
- Naughty Boy – co-producer
- Helen Paterson – violin
- Brandyn Phillips – saxophone, trumpet
- Jake Rea – violin
- Kotono Sato – violin
- Hilary Skewes – strings (contractor)
- Mike "Spike" Stent – mixing
- Felix Tanner – viola
- TMS (Ben Kohn, Tom Barnes, Pete Kelleher) – producer
- Eg White – piano, programming (strings, drums), bass, bells, producer, recording engineer (strings), arrangement (strings)
- Wayne Wilkins – programming (keyboards), producer
- Warren Zielinski – violin

== Charts ==
Chart performance for I Am
Chart (2015)	Peak position
Australian Albums (ARIA)	82
Austrian Albums (Ö3 Austria)	34
Belgian Albums (Ultratop Flanders)	83
Belgian Albums (Ultratop Wallonia)	44
German Albums (Offizielle Top 100)	33
Japanese Albums (Oricon)	185
Dutch Albums (Album Top 100)	49
Greek Albums (IFPI)	75
Irish Albums (IRMA)	22
Scottish Albums (Official Charts)	11
South Korean International Albums (Gaon)	12
Spanish Albums (Promusicae)	25
Swiss Albums (Schweizer Hitparade)	23
UK Albums (Official Charts)	12
US Billboard 200	38

== Release history ==
List of release dates, showing country, format, label, edition, and reference
Country	Date	Edition	Format	Label	Ref.
Ireland	11 September 2015	Standard; deluxe	CD; digital download	Island	
United Kingdom	11 September 2015	Standard; deluxe	CD; digital download	Island	
United States	11 September 2015	Standard; deluxe	CD; digital download	Def Jam	
