= Fire Under My Feet =

Single by Leona Lewis

from the album I Am
- Released: 7 June 2015
- Studio: Kite Music (Los Angeles)
- Length: 3:34
- Label: Island; Def Jam
- Songwriters: Leona Lewis; Toby Gad
- Producer: Toby Gad

Leona Lewis singles chronology
"One More Sleep" (2013)	"Fire Under My Feet" (2015)	"I Am" (2015)

Music video
- "Fire Under My Feet" on YouTube

"Fire Under My Feet" is a song by British singer and songwriter Leona Lewis from her fifth studio album, I Am (2015). It was released as the lead single from the album on 7 June 2015 by Island and Def Jam. An uptempo song with gospel influences, "Fire Under My Feet" was recorded at Kite Music Studios in Los Angeles and was written by Lewis with Toby Gad, who also produced the song.

== Background ==
During an interview with Lewis Corner for Digital Spy in November 2013, Lewis revealed that she had been "getting ideas together" for her next studio album during the summer of 2013, but had to postpone the recording of the album until January 2014, as she was focusing on the promotion of her holiday album, Christmas, with Love, released in November 2013. Throughout early-mid 2014, Lewis commenced to part ways with Syco, the label to which she had previously been signed since winning the third series of British reality singing competition, The X Factor in 2006. On 3 June 2014, it was announced that she had joined to Island Records. Lewis stated that the move was a "dream come true" and that she could not wait to "start making music" on the new label.

"Fire Under My Feet" was the first song Lewis wrote after making the move away from Syco. Co-written with long-time collaborator Toby Gad, the song's producer, it set much of the tone for parent album I Am, with Lewis commenting: "That was where it first began for me and I thought I need to build energy into the record and I needed that encouragement and empowerment." She went on to describe the development process: "I remember going into the studio and just wanting to do something that – I was so frustrated and you know I was passionate about where I wanted to go next and what I wanted to do, I wanted a song that kind of had all of that in it, inside it. Toby and I started working on the music first and then I kind of had this little thing going through my brain, it just came very naturally."

== Music and lyrics ==
"Fire Under My Feet" is an uptempo song with elements of gospel. Lewis herself characterized the song as "very bluesy, almost gospel, earthy." The songs lasts for a duration of three minutes and 34 seconds. Instrumentation consists of a piano and a "foot-tapping, clappy beat." For the chorus, Lewis employs a "diva-like" style of vocals as she sings the lyrics "I got fire under my feet, and I feel it in my heartbeat/ You can't put out these flames/ You can't keep me down in my seat." Upon its release, "Fire Under My Feet" generated numerous comparisons to that of Adele's 2011 single "Rolling in the Deep." A reviewer for MTV UK noted that the uptempo melody and the lyrics "woah, woah, woah" resemble elements the latters song.

== Critical reception ==
"Fire Under My Feet" earned positive reviews from critics. Bustle editor Alex Kritselis called the song "fantastic" and described it as a "soulful and empowering anthem that finds Lewis singing about taking control of her life and embracing a new beginning." Renowned for Sound found that "Fire Under My Feet" was a "rantic gospel-influenced pop anthem" and complimented it for its "energetic and refreshing feeling." The Independent called the song a "thrusting, powerful track that makes you want to dance." Jocelyn Vena of Billboard described the song as "anthemic" and continued to compliment Lewis' vocal performance and prowess. Lewis Corner of Digital Spy categorized the song as a "big new statement single" and a "jaunty pop number that hears Leona's burning ambition to continue as one of the UK's best vocalists in this new phase of her career."

Less impressed, The Guardian's Michael Cragg wrote a piece for the paper titled From X Factor to off the charts: why Leona Lewis can't crack the top 40, in which he analysed why the song "failed to burn up the music charts" in his words. He noted that the British media leaked early details about the release including the song's themes and ultimately suggested that the song was "allegedly a stinging attack on Cowell and how free she is from the shackles of Syco." Cragg also criticised the song itself saying that the song "strong enough to make its mark in today's overcrowded pop market" and concluded that it was "also hard to shake the fact that it sounded better when Adele did it as "Rolling in the Deep" (2010) a few years ago."

== Commercial performance ==
On 19 December 2014, a short clip of Lewis performing portions of the song was uploaded to her Facebook account with the caption "Getting ready for 2015." A second clip was uploaded to Lewis' personal YouTube account on 12 February 2015. Throughout early-mid 2015, more snippets of the track and its music video surfaced over the internet, confirming the track's title to be "Fire Under My Feet." On 10 May 2015, the song's single cover was released. The full song made its debut on BBC Radio 2 on 11 May 2015, several weeks before the single was released for digital download and streaming. The track was confirmed available digitally by Def Jam Records on 9 June 2015. Throughout May 2015, three remixes of "Fire Under My Feet" were uploaded to Lewis' Vevo account, including "Fire Under My Feet (Endor Remix)" (on 11 May 2015), "Fire Under My Feet (Steve Pitron & Max Sanna Remix)" (on 15 May 2015), and "Fire Under My Feet (Benny Benassi Remix)" (on 22 May 2015).

For the week ending 30 May 2015, "Fire Under My Feet" debuted at number 34 on the Billboard's US Twitter Top Tracks chart. The following week, it rose to number 12. The same week, the song debuted at number 45 on the US Hot Dance Club Songs chart. It rose to 36 the following week, before eventually peaking at number four in the week of 22 August 2015. It was Lewis' second single to reach the top ten of the charts, following the number-one success of "Collide" in 2011. In the United Kingdom, "Fire Under My Feet" made its debut on the UK Singles Chart at number 51, becoming Lewis' second single to miss the top 40. It did however reach number 26 on the sales only version of the chart. The song also charted at number 26 on the UK Download Chart, while also peaking at number 23 on the Scottish Singles Chart. Elsewhere, "Fire Under My Feet" became a top 20 success in Hungary, where it peaked at number 13 on the Rádiós Top 40 chart, while also reaching number 29 on the Single Top 40 chart.

== Music video ==
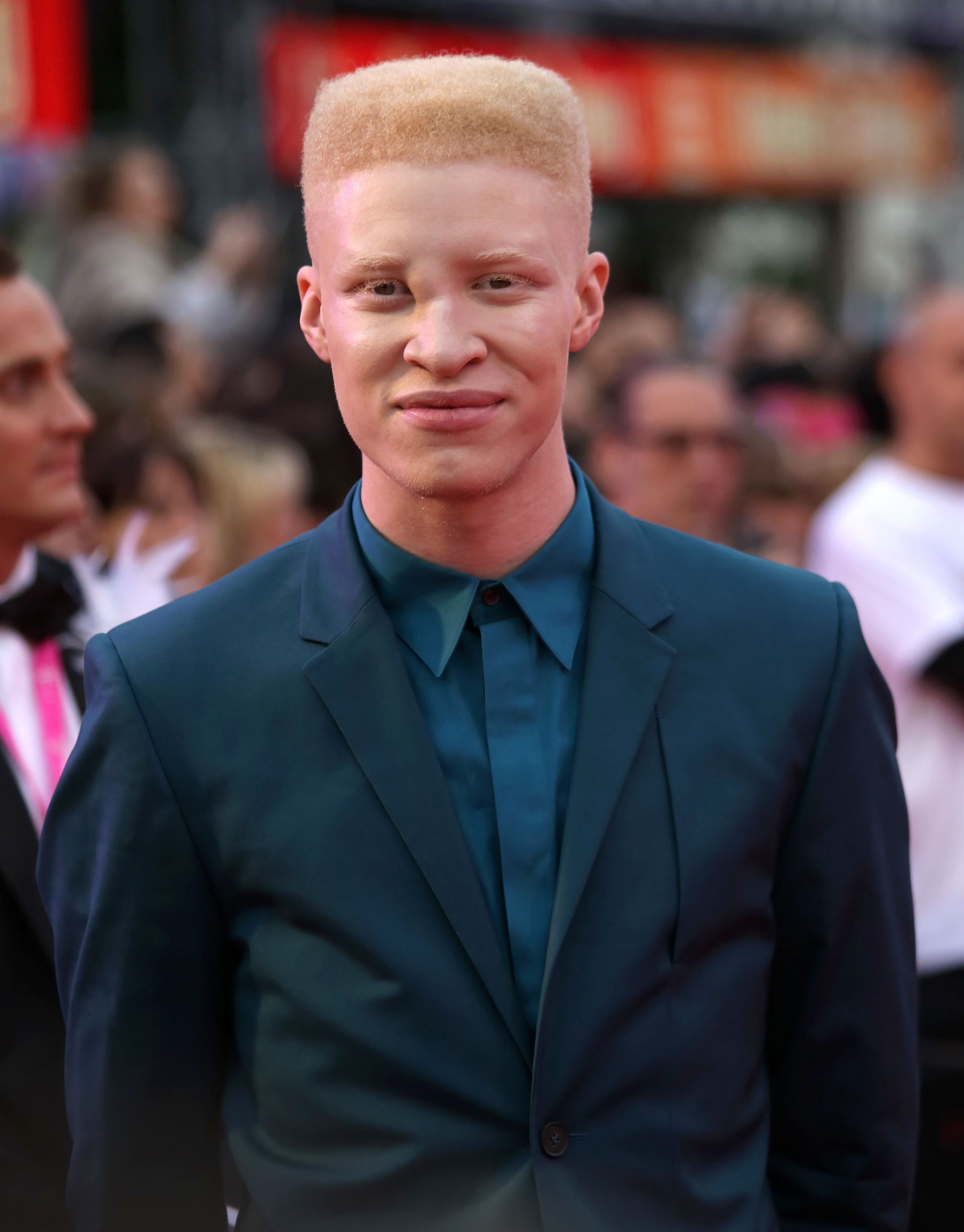
Lewis' friend, model Shaun Ross appears in the video for "Fire Under My Feet."

A music video for "Fire Under My Feet" was directed by Declan Whitebloom. Lewis, who developed the concept for the visuals, explained that her intention was to highlight the various challenges individuals encounter. In an interview with British online newspaper The Independent, she elaborated: "So many people judge a book by its cover and I've learnt you can't do that. My friend Shaun Ross is in the video. He is the first male albino model and he is doing so well in his career. I think that we are embracing people’s differences much more now and we are making progress." Aparat from Ross, a runner who was born without the lower half of her legs, a dancer with a birthmark on her face, a drag queen and a boxer appear in the video. Regarding their involvement, Lewis described it as "incredible" that the cast were able to "overcome [many obstacles] to do what they are passionate about."

The video begins with an a cappella sequence in which Lewis, dressed in denim, sings the opening lines of the song. Further scenes, in addition to those featuring Lewis, include studio shots set against a neutral backdrop, interwoven with portraits and everyday scenes of inspiring individuals. Lewis further commented on the style of the visuals: "The video is stripping it down, very minimal make-up, minimal hair, minimal everything so you can see the real person behind what is happening – instead of all the stuff that you pile on." "Fire Under My Feet" was premiered online on 11 May 2015, followed by a behind the scenes video that was uploaded to Lewis' Vevo account on 17 May 2015. It featured some of the cast who starred in the video talking about how they were able to overcome adversity, tying in with the song's theme of self-empowerment. Justin Harp from Digital Spy described the video as "inspiring."

== Live performances ==
Lewis performed the song live on numerous occasions throughout 2015, the first of which was an acoustic performance for BBC Scotland on 3 June 2015. The first televised performance of the track was on British television variety show Sunday Night at the Palladium on 7 June 2015. Other notable performances of the track were at G-A-Y Heaven on 13 June 2015, where Lewis also performed two new tracks from her upcoming album I Am: "I Got You" and "Another Love Song"; and on BBC One chat show programme The One Show on 19 June 2015.

== Track listings ==
Digital single

1. "Fire Under My Feet" – 3:34

Digital Remix Single

1. "Fire Under My Feet" (Dzeko & Torres Remix) – 4:07

Digital Remixes EP

1. "Fire Under My Feet" (Benny Benassi Remix) – 5:17
2. "Fire Under My Feet" (Endor Remix) – 3:33
3. "Fire Under My Feet" (Steve Pitron & Max Sanna Remix) – 3:43

== Personnel ==
Credits sourced from album booklet and liner.

- Leona Lewis – vocals, composer
- Toby Gad – instruments, programming, mixing, composer

== Charts ==
=== Weekly charts ===
Weekly chart performance for "Fire Under My Feet"
Chart (2015)	Peak position
Austria (Ö3 Austria Top 40)	74
Belgium (Ultratip Bubbling Under Flanders)	63
CIS Airplay (TopHit)	103
Germany (GfK)	94
Ireland (IRMA)	30
Hungary (Rádiós Top 40)	13
Hungary (Single Top 40)	29
Slovakia (Rádio Top 100 Oficiálna)	46
UK Singles (Official Charts)	51
US Dance Club Songs (Billboard)	4

=== Year-end charts ===
Year-end chart performance for "Fire Under My Feet"
Chart (2015)	Position
Hungary (Rádiós Top 40)	98

== Radio and release history ==
Release history and formats for "Fire Under My Feet"
Country	Date	Version	Format	Label	Ref.
Various	7 June 2015	Digital download; streaming	Digital single; Digital remixes EP	Island; Universal Music	
United States	7 June 2015	Digital download; streaming	Digital single; Digital remixes EP	Def Jam	
United States	6 July 2015	Digital download; streaming	Digital remix single	Def Jam	
