= David Gray: Live =

- UK cover of David Gray: Live

Live album by David Gray
- Released: 13 November 2000
- Recorded: 22 December 1999
- Venues: The Point Depot; Dublin, Ireland

David Gray: Live (released as David Gray: Live at the Point in the U.S.) is a live performance video by musician David Gray. It was released on 13 November 2000.

The show was filmed at The Point Depot in Dublin, Ireland, on 22 December 1999, the final night of Gray's Irish tour in support of his White Ladder album.

Cover of the US version

As Gray explains in the Up to a Point documentary on the DVD version of the performance: “It's hard to avoid the clichés, but what the hell. It was an unforgettable night to crown an incredible year. Not so much a gig as a celebration. A moment when it all made sense, a stepping into bigger shoes, a taste of things to come.”

The performance of "Babylon" was released as a B-side on Gray's "Please Forgive Me" CD single.

== Running order ==
1. "Sail Away"
2. "White Ladder"
3. "Late Night Radio"
4. "Faster Sooner Now"
5. "Lead Me Upstairs"
6. "Babylon"
7. "The Light"
8. "We're Not Right"
9. "Flame Turns Blue"
10. "This Year's Love"
11. "Coming Down"
12. "Shine"

Encores:

1. "A Century Ends" (Gray breaks a guitar string during the song but manages to switch to his backup guitar fast enough that he doesn't miss a lyric.)
2. "My Oh My"
3. "Wisdom"
4. "Silver Lining"
5. "Please Forgive Me"

== Certifications ==
| Region | Certification | Certified units/sales |
|---|---|---|
| Australia (ARIA) | Platinum | 15,000^{^} |
^{^} Shipments figures based on certification alone.
