= List of UK Albums Chart number ones of the 2000s =

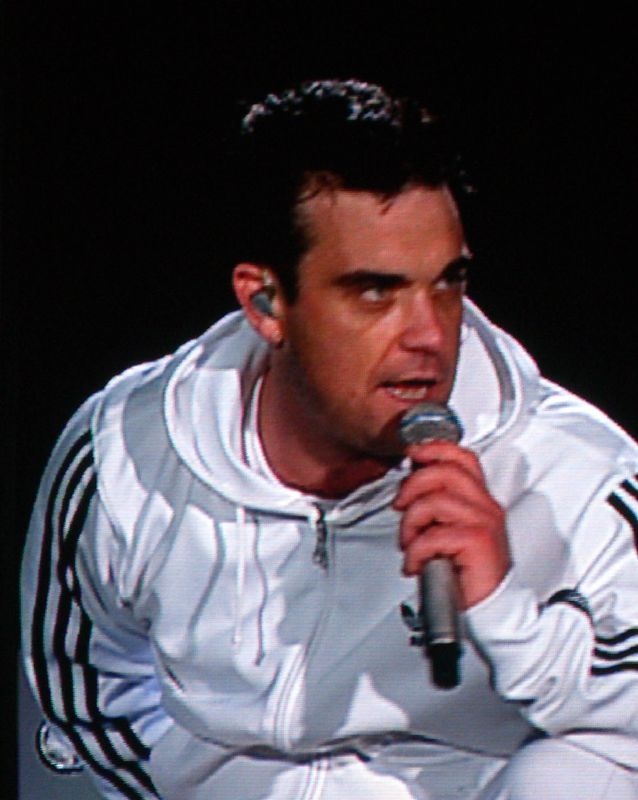
Robbie Williams spent 23 weeks at the top of the UK Albums Chart during the 2000s, longer than any other artist.

The UK Albums Chart is a weekly record chart based on album sales from Sunday to Saturday in the United Kingdom; during the 2000s, a total of 274 different albums by 170 artists reached number one. The chart was compiled weekly by the Official Charts Company (OCC) on behalf of the British music industry—it listed only physical album sales until 2007, after which it also included albums sold digitally. The OCC defined an "album" to be any music release that featured more than four tracks or lasted longer than 25 minutes. Each week's new number one was first announced on Sunday evenings by BBC Radio 1 on their weekly chart show.

The most successful albums during the 2000s were Life for Rent by Dido and Back to Bedlam by James Blunt. Released in 2003 and 2004 respectively, each spent ten weeks at number one—Back to Bedlam was also the biggest-selling album of the decade. Dido and Blunt also topped the chart with one other album each. Irish boy band Westlife reached number one with seven different releases, the most of any act. British singer Robbie Williams released six number one albums, which spent a total of 23 weeks on the top of the chart, longer than any other artist—by 2005, Williams had sold more albums during the 2000s than any other act.

The most successful record label during this period was Polydor Records—benefitting from strong sales from artists such as Ronan Keating, Scissor Sisters and Take That, Polydor topped the chart with 13 different albums which spent 33 weeks at number one, longer than any other company. Columbia Records released 17 albums that reached number one, the most of any label; its artists roster featured Barbra Streisand and Bruce Springsteen. In August 2003, Magic and Medicine by The Coral became the 700th album to top the UK chart—fewer than four years later, Not Too Late by Norah Jones became the 800th album to do so.

Following its significantly increased popularity in the early 21st century, reality television began to have a significant impact on the British music industry. Of the 274 albums that reached number one in the UK charts, 15 were by artists that had found fame through a reality TV programme. The first such act was Hear'Say, a British pop group formed by the television show Popstars. In March 2001, their debut album Popstars topped the chart and became the fastest-selling debut in UK chart history to that date. The only reality television stars to top the album chart with two different releases were Will Young, the 2002 winner of Pop Idol, Girls Aloud, the girl group formed by the TV series Popstars: The Rivals, and Leona Lewis, the 2006 winner of The X Factor. Like Hear'Say, Lewis's first album Spirit broke the record for the fastest-selling debut in UK chart history.

== Number ones ==
Key
No.	nth album to top the UK Albums Chart
re	Return of an album to number one
Silver	Silver certification (60,000 units)
Gold	Gold certification (100,000 units)
Platinum	Platinum certification (300,000 units)
†	Best-selling album of the year
‡	Best-selling album of the decade

No.	Artist (Note: The artist, album, date of reaching number one and number of weeks at number one are those given by the OCC.)	Album	Record label (Note: The record labels are those given by the OCC.)	Reached number one	Weeks at number one	Certification (Note: The certifications are those given by the British Phonographic Industry.)
2000
re	Shania Twain	Come On Over	Mercury	5 December 1999	5	12× Platinum
re	Travis	The Man Who	Independiente	9 January 2000	5	9× Platinum
618	Gabrielle	Rise	Go! Beat	13 February 2000	3	4× Platinum
619	Oasis	Standing on the Shoulder of Giants	Big Brother	5 March 2000	1	2× Platinum
re	Travis	The Man Who	Independiente	12 March 2000	2	9× Platinum
620	Santana	Supernatural	Arista	26 March 2000	2	3× Platinum
621	Moby	Play	Mute	9 April 2000	5	6× Platinum
re	Tom Jones	Reload	Gut	14 May 2000	1	5× Platinum
622	Whitney Houston	Whitney: The Greatest Hits	Arista	21 May 2000	2	5× Platinum
623	Bon Jovi	Crush	Mercury	4 June 2000	1	Platinum
re	Tom Jones	Reload	Gut	11 June 2000	1	5× Platinum
624	S Club 7	7	Polydor	18 June 2000	1	4× Platinum
625	Eminem	The Marshall Mathers LP	Interscope	25 June 2000	1	9× Platinum
626	Richard Ashcroft	Alone with Everybody	Hut	2 July 2000	1	Platinum
re	Eminem	The Marshall Mathers LP	Interscope	9 July 2000	1	9× Platinum
627	Coldplay	Parachutes	Parlophone	16 July 2000	1	9× Platinum
628	The Corrs	In Blue	Atlantic	23 July 2000	2	3× Platinum
629	Ronan Keating	Ronan	Polydor	6 August 2000	2	4× Platinum
630	Craig David	Born to Do It	Wildstar	20 August 2000	2	6× Platinum
631	Robbie Williams	Sing When You're Winning	Chrysalis	3 September 2000	3	8× Platinum
632	Madonna	Music	Maverick	24 September 2000	2	5× Platinum
633	Radiohead	Kid A	Parlophone	8 October 2000	2	Platinum
634	All Saints	Saints & Sinners	London	22 October 2000	1	2× Platinum
635	Texas	The Greatest Hits	Mercury	29 October 2000	1	6× Platinum
636	U2	All That You Can't Leave Behind	Island	5 November 2000	1	4× Platinum
637	Westlife	Coast to Coast	RCA	12 November 2000	1	6× Platinum
638	The Beatles	1 †	Apple	19 November 2000	9	13× Platinum
2001
re	Texas	The Greatest Hits	Mercury	21 January 2001	1	6× Platinum
639	Limp Bizkit	Chocolate Starfish and the Hot Dog Flavored Water	Interscope	28 January 2001	1	3× Platinum
640	Dido	No Angel †	Arista	4 February 2001	6	10× Platinum
641	Eva Cassidy	Songbird	Blix Street/Hot	18 March 2001	2	6× Platinum
642	Hear'Say	Popstars	Polydor	1 April 2001	2	3× Platinum
643	Stereophonics	Just Enough Education to Perform	V2	15 April 2001	2	6× Platinum
644	Ash	Free All Angels	Infectious	29 April 2001	1	Platinum
645	Destiny's Child	Survivor	Columbia	6 May 2001	2	3× Platinum
646	R.E.M.	Reveal	Warner Bros.	20 May 2001	2	Platinum
647	Shaggy	Hot Shot	MCA	3 June 2001	1	3× Platinum
648	Radiohead	Amnesiac	Parlophone	10 June 2001	1	Platinum
649	Travis	The Invisible Band	Independiente	17 June 2001	4	4× Platinum
650	Usher	8701	Arista	15 July 2001	1	2× Platinum
re	Destiny's Child	Survivor	Columbia	22 July 2001	2	3× Platinum
651	David Gray	White Ladder	IHT/East West	5 August 2001	1	10× Platinum
652	Atomic Kitten	Right Now	Innocent	12 August 2001	1	2× Platinum
re	David Gray	White Ladder	IHT/East West	19 August 2001	1	10× Platinum
653	Staind	Break the Cycle	Elektra	26 August 2001	1	Platinum
654	Slipknot	Iowa	Roadrunner	2 September 2001	1	Platinum
655	Jamiroquai	A Funk Odyssey	Sony S2	9 September 2001	2	2× Platinum
656	Macy Gray	The Id	Epic	23 September 2001	1	Gold
re	Dido	No Angel †	Arista	30 September 2001	1	10× Platinum
657	Kylie Minogue	Fever	Parlophone	7 October 2001	2	5× Platinum
658	Steps	Gold: Greatest Hits	Jive	21 October 2001	2	5× Platinum
659	Michael Jackson	Invincible	Epic	4 November 2001	1	Platinum
re	Steps	Gold: Greatest Hits	Jive	11 November 2001	1	5× Platinum
660	Westlife	World of Our Own	RCA	18 November 2001	1	4× Platinum
661	Robbie Williams	Swing When You're Winning	Chrysalis	25 November 2001	7	8× Platinum
2002
re	Stereophonics	Just Enough Education to Perform	V2	13 January 2002	3	6× Platinum
662	The Chemical Brothers	Come with Us	Virgin	3 February 2002	1	Gold
663	Enrique Iglesias	Escape	Interscope	10 February 2002	2	5× Platinum
664	Sting and The Police	The Very Best of Sting & The Police	A&M	24 February 2002	2	5× Platinum
665	Barbra Streisand	The Essential Barbra Streisand	Columbia	10 March 2002	1	2× Platinum
666	Nickelback	Silver Side Up	Roadrunner	17 March 2002	2	3× Platinum
667	Céline Dion	A New Day Has Come	Epic	31 March 2002	4	Platinum
668	Blue	All Rise	Innocent	28 April 2002	1	4× Platinum
669	Doves	The Last Broadcast	Heavenly	5 May 2002	2	Platinum
670	Moby	18	Mute	19 May 2002	1	Platinum
671	Ronan Keating	Destination	Polydor	26 May 2002	1	2× Platinum
672	Eminem	The Eminem Show	Interscope	2 June 2002	5	7× Platinum
673	Oasis	Heathen Chemistry	Big Brother	7 July 2002	1	4× Platinum
674	Red Hot Chili Peppers	By the Way	Warner Bros.	14 July 2002	3	7× Platinum
675	Bruce Springsteen	The Rising	Columbia	4 August 2002	1	Platinum
re	Red Hot Chili Peppers	By the Way	Warner Bros.	11 August 2002	2	7× Platinum
676	Eva Cassidy	Imagine	Blix Street/Hot	25 August 2002	1	Platinum
677	Coldplay	A Rush of Blood to the Head	Parlophone	1 September 2002	2	10× Platinum
678	Atomic Kitten	Feels So Good	Innocent	15 September 2002	1	2× Platinum
679	Paul Weller	Illumination	Independiente	22 September 2002	1	Gold
680	Elvis Presley	ELV1S: 30 No. 1 Hits	RCA	29 September 2002	2	8× Platinum
681	Will Young	From Now On	S	13 October 2002	2	2× Platinum
682	Foo Fighters	One by One	RCA	27 October 2002	1	3× Platinum
683	David Gray	A New Day at Midnight	East West	3 November 2002	1	4× Platinum
684	Blue	One Love	Innocent	10 November 2002	1	4× Platinum
685	Westlife	Unbreakable – The Greatest Hits Volume 1	S	17 November 2002	1	6× Platinum
686	Robbie Williams	Escapology †	EMI	24 November 2002	6	7× Platinum
2003
687	Avril Lavigne	Let Go	Arista	5 January 2003	3	6× Platinum
688	Justin Timberlake	Justified	Jive	26 January 2003	2	7× Platinum
689	Kelly Rowland	Simply Deep	Columbia	9 February 2003	1	Platinum
690	Massive Attack	100th Window	Virgin	16 February 2003	1	Gold
re	Justin Timberlake	Justified	Jive	23 February 2003	1	7× Platinum
691	Norah Jones	Come Away with Me	Parlophone	2 March 2003	4	9× Platinum
692	Linkin Park	Meteora	Warner Bros.	30 March 2003	1	4× Platinum
693	The White Stripes	Elephant	XL	6 April 2003	2	3× Platinum
re	Coldplay	A Rush of Blood to the Head	Parlophone	20 April 2003	1	10× Platinum
694	Madonna	American Life	Maverick	27 April 2003	1	Platinum
re	Justin Timberlake	Justified	Jive	4 May 2003	1	7× Platinum
695	Blur	Think Tank	Parlophone	11 May 2003	1	Gold
re	Justin Timberlake	Justified	Jive	18 May 2003	3	7× Platinum
696	Stereophonics	You Gotta Go There to Come Back	V2	8 June 2003	1	2× Platinum
697	Radiohead	Hail to the Thief	Parlophone	15 June 2003	1	Platinum
698	Evanescence	Fallen	Epic/Wind-up	22 June 2003	1	4× Platinum
699	Beyoncé	Dangerously in Love	Columbia	29 June 2003	5	4× Platinum
700	The Coral	Magic and Medicine	Deltasonic	3 August 2003	1	Gold
re	Robbie Williams	Escapology	EMI	10 August 2003	1	7× Platinum
701	Eva Cassidy	American Tune	Blix Street/Hot	17 August 2003	2	Gold
702	The Darkness	Permission to Land	Must Destroy	31 August 2003	4	4× Platinum
703	Muse	Absolution	East West	28 September 2003	1	3× Platinum
704	Dido	Life for Rent †	Cheeky	5 October 2003	4	9× Platinum
705	R.E.M.	In Time: The Best of R.E.M. 1988–2003	Warner Bros.	2 November 2003	1	5× Platinum
706	Blue	Guilty	Innocent	9 November 2003	1	2× Platinum
re	Dido	Life for Rent †	Cheeky	16 November 2003	1	9× Platinum
707	Michael Jackson	Number Ones	Epic	23 November 2003	1	10× Platinum
708	Westlife	Turnaround	S	30 November 2003	1	2× Platinum
709	Will Young	Friday's Child	S	7 December 2003	1	5× Platinum
re	Dido	Life for Rent †	Cheeky	14 December 2003	3	9× Platinum
2004
re	Will Young	Friday's Child	S	4 January 2004	1	5× Platinum
re	Dido	Life for Rent	Cheeky	11 January 2004	2	9× Platinum
710	Katie Melua	Call Off the Search	Dramatico	25 January 2004	3	6× Platinum
711	Norah Jones	Feels like Home	Blue Note	15 February 2004	2	4× Platinum
re	Katie Melua	Call Off the Search	Dramatico	29 February 2004	3	6× Platinum
712	George Michael	Patience	Aegean	21 March 2004	1	2× Platinum
713	Usher	Confessions	LaFace/Arista	28 March 2004	1	6× Platinum
714	Anastacia	Anastacia	Epic	4 April 2004	2	4× Platinum
715	Guns N' Roses	Greatest Hits	Geffen	18 April 2004	2	8× Platinum
716	D12	D12 World	Interscope	2 May 2004	1	Platinum
re	Guns N' Roses	Greatest Hits	Geffen	9 May 2004	1	8× Platinum
717	Keane	Hopes and Fears	Island	16 May 2004	2	10× Platinum
718	Avril Lavigne	Under My Skin	Arista	30 May 2004	1	2× Platinum
re	Keane	Hopes and Fears	Island	6 June 2004	1	10× Platinum
719	Faithless	No Roots	Cheeky	13 June 2004	1	Gold
re	Keane	Hopes and Fears	Island	20 June 2004	1	10× Platinum
720	The Streets	A Grand Don't Come for Free	679/Locked On	27 June 2004	1	4× Platinum
721	Scissor Sisters	Scissor Sisters †	Polydor	4 July 2004	1	9× Platinum
722	McFly	Room on the 3rd Floor	Universal	11 July 2004	1	2× Platinum
re	Scissor Sisters	Scissor Sisters †	Polydor	18 July 2004	1	9× Platinum
re	The Streets	A Grand Don't Come for Free	679/Locked On	25 July 2004	1	4× Platinum
723	Red Hot Chili Peppers	Live in Hyde Park	Warner Bros.	1 August 2004	2	Gold
re	Anastacia	Anastacia	Epic	15 August 2004	1	4× Platinum
724	Maroon 5	Songs About Jane	J	22 August 2004	1	7× Platinum
725	The Prodigy	Always Outnumbered, Never Outgunned	XL	29 August 2004	1	Gold
726	The Libertines	The Libertines	Rough Trade	5 September 2004	1	Platinum
727	Natasha Bedingfield	Unwritten	Phonogenic	12 September 2004	1	3× Platinum
728	Embrace	Out of Nothing	Independiente	19 September 2004	1	2× Platinum
729	Green Day	American Idiot	Reprise	26 September 2004	1	9× Platinum
730	Joss Stone	Mind Body & Soul	Relentless/Virgin	3 October 2004	1	3× Platinum
731	R.E.M.	Around the Sun	Warner Bros.	10 October 2004	1	Gold
732	Ronan Keating	10 Years of Hits	Polydor	17 October 2004	1	4× Platinum
733	Robbie Williams	Greatest Hits	Chrysalis	24 October 2004	2	8× Platinum
734	Il Divo	Il Divo	Syco	7 November 2004	1	5× Platinum
735	Eminem	Encore	Interscope	14 November 2004	2	4× Platinum
736	U2	How to Dismantle an Atomic Bomb	Island	28 November 2004	3	4× Platinum
re	Robbie Williams	Greatest Hits	Chrysalis	19 December 2004	2	8× Platinum
2005
re	Green Day	American Idiot	Reprise	2 January 2005	1	9× Platinum
re	Scissor Sisters	Scissor Sisters	Polydor	9 January 2005	1	9× Platinum
737	The Killers	Hot Fuss	Lizard King	16 January 2005	2	8× Platinum
738	The Chemical Brothers	Push the Button	Virgin	30 January 2005	1	Platinum
739	Athlete	Tourist	Parlophone	6 February 2005	1	Platinum
re	Keane	Hopes and Fears	Island	13 February 2005	1	10× Platinum
re	Scissor Sisters	Scissor Sisters	Polydor	20 February 2005	1	9× Platinum
740	Doves	Some Cities	Heavenly	27 February 2005	1	Gold
741	G4	G4	Sony	6 March 2005	1	2× Platinum
742	50 Cent	The Massacre	Interscope	13 March 2005	1	3× Platinum
743	Stereophonics	Language. Sex. Violence. Other?	V2	20 March 2005	1	2× Platinum
744	Tony Christie	Definitive Collection	UMTV	27 March 2005	2	2× Platinum
745	Natalie Imbruglia	Counting Down the Days	Brightside	10 April 2005	1	Gold
746	Basement Jaxx	The Singles	XL	17 April 2005	1	3× Platinum
747	Akon	Trouble	Universal	24 April 2005	1	2× Platinum
748	Bruce Springsteen	Devils & Dust	Columbia	1 May 2005	1	Gold
re	Akon	Trouble	Universal	8 May 2005	1	2× Platinum
749	Steve Brookstein	Heart and Soul	Syco	15 May 2005	1	Gold
750	Faithless	Forever Faithless – The Greatest Hits	Cheeky	22 May 2005	1	4× Platinum
751	Gorillaz	Demon Days	Parlophone	29 May 2005	1	6× Platinum
752	Oasis	Don't Believe the Truth	Big Brother	5 June 2005	1	3× Platinum
753	Coldplay	X&Y	Parlophone	12 June 2005	4	9× Platinum
754	James Blunt	Back to Bedlam ‡	Atlantic	10 July 2005	8	11× Platinum
755	McFly	Wonderland	Island	4 September 2005	1	Platinum
re	James Blunt	Back to Bedlam ‡	Atlantic	11 September 2005	1	11× Platinum
756	David Gray	Life in Slow Motion	Atlantic	18 September 2005	2	2× Platinum
757	Katie Melua	Piece by Piece	Dramatico	2 October 2005	1	4× Platinum
758	Franz Ferdinand	You Could Have It So Much Better	Domino	9 October 2005	1	Platinum
759	Sugababes	Taller in More Ways	Island	16 October 2005	1	3× Platinum
760	The Prodigy	Their Law: The Singles 1990–2005	XL	23 October 2005	1	4× Platinum
761	Robbie Williams	Intensive Care	Chrysalis	30 October 2005	1	5× Platinum
762	Westlife	Face to Face	S	6 November 2005	1	4× Platinum
763	Il Divo	Ancora	Syco	13 November 2005	1	3× Platinum
764	Madonna	Confessions on a Dance Floor	Warner Bros.	20 November 2005	2	4× Platinum
765	Eminem	Curtain Call: The Hits	Interscope	4 December 2005	5	12× Platinum
2006
766	The Strokes	First Impressions of Earth	Rough Trade	8 January 2006	1	Gold
re	James Blunt	Back to Bedlam ‡	Atlantic	15 January 2006	1	11× Platinum
767	Hard-Fi	Stars of CCTV	Atlantic/Necessary	22 January 2006	1	2× Platinum
768	Arctic Monkeys	Whatever People Say I Am, That's What I'm Not	Domino	29 January 2006	4	8× Platinum
769	Jack Johnson	In Between Dreams	Brushfire/Island	26 February 2006	1	5× Platinum
770	Corinne Bailey Rae	Corinne Bailey Rae	EMI	5 March 2006	1	3× Platinum
771	David Gilmour	On an Island	EMI	12 March 2006	1	Platinum
re	Corinne Bailey Rae	Corinne Bailey Rae	EMI	19 March 2006	1	3× Platinum
772	Journey South	Journey South	Syco	26 March 2006	1	Platinum
773	Embrace	This New Day	Independiente	2 April 2006	1	Gold
774	Morrissey	Ringleader of the Tormentors	Attack	9 April 2006	1	Gold
775	The Streets	The Hardest Way to Make an Easy Living	679/Locked On	16 April 2006	1	Gold
776	Shayne Ward	Shayne Ward	Syco	23 April 2006	1	Platinum
777	Gnarls Barkley	St. Elsewhere	Warner Bros.	30 April 2006	1	2× Platinum
778	Snow Patrol	Eyes Open †	Fiction	7 May 2006	1	8× Platinum
779	Red Hot Chili Peppers	Stadium Arcadium	Warner Bros.	14 May 2006	3	3× Platinum
780	Orson	Bright Idea	Mercury	4 June 2006	1	Platinum
781	Sandi Thom	Smile... It Confuses People	RCA	11 June 2006	1	Platinum
782	Keane	Under the Iron Sea	Island	18 June 2006	2	3× Platinum
783	Lostprophets	Liberation Transmission	Visible Noise	2 July 2006	1	Platinum
784	Muse	Black Holes and Revelations	Helium 3/Warner Bros.	9 July 2006	2	4× Platinum
785	Razorlight	Razorlight	Vertigo	23 July 2006	2	5× Platinum
786	James Morrison	Undiscovered	Polydor	6 August 2006	2	5× Platinum
787	Christina Aguilera	Back to Basics	RCA	20 August 2006	1	2× Platinum
re	Snow Patrol	Eyes Open †	Fiction	27 August 2006	1	8× Platinum
788	Kasabian	Empire	Columbia	3 September 2006	1	2× Platinum
re	Snow Patrol	Eyes Open †	Fiction	10 September 2006	1	8× Platinum
789	Justin Timberlake	FutureSex/LoveSounds	Jive	17 September 2006	1	4× Platinum
790	Scissor Sisters	Ta-Dah	Polydor	24 September 2006	2	5× Platinum
791	The Killers	Sam's Town	Vertigo	8 October 2006	3	5× Platinum
792	Robbie Williams	Rudebox	Chrysalis	29 October 2006	1	2× Platinum
793	Girls Aloud	The Sound of Girls Aloud: The Greatest Hits	Fascination	5 November 2006	1	4× Platinum
794	Jamiroquai	High Times: Singles 1992–2006	Columbia	12 November 2006	1	3× Platinum
795	George Michael	Twenty Five	Aegean	19 November 2006	1	6× Platinum
796	Westlife	The Love Album	S	26 November 2006	1	3× Platinum
797	Take That	Beautiful World	Polydor	3 December 2006	6	9× Platinum
2007
798	Amy Winehouse	Back to Black †	Island	14 January 2007	2	15× Platinum
799	The View	Hats Off to the Buskers	1965	28 January 2007	1	Platinum
800	Norah Jones	Not Too Late	Blue Note	4 February 2007	1	Gold
801	Mika	Life in Cartoon Motion	Casablanca/Island	11 February 2007	2	6× Platinum
re	Amy Winehouse	Back to Black †	Island	25 February 2007	1	15× Platinum
802	Kaiser Chiefs	Yours Truly, Angry Mob	B-Unique/Polydor	4 March 2007	2	2× Platinum
803	Ray Quinn	Doing It My Way	Syco	18 March 2007	1	Gold
re	Take That	Beautiful World	Polydor	25 March 2007	2	9× Platinum
804	Kings of Leon	Because of the Times	Hand Me Down	8 April 2007	2	3× Platinum
805	Avril Lavigne	The Best Damn Thing	RCA	22 April 2007	1	Platinum
806	Arctic Monkeys	Favourite Worst Nightmare	Domino	29 April 2007	3	5× Platinum
807	Linkin Park	Minutes to Midnight	Warner Bros.	20 May 2007	1	2× Platinum
808	Maroon 5	It Won't Be Soon Before Long	A&M/Octone	27 May 2007	2	Platinum
809	Rihanna	Good Girl Gone Bad	Def Jam	10 June 2007	1	8× Platinum
810	Traveling Wilburys	The Traveling Wilburys Collection	Rhino	17 June 2007	1	Platinum
811	The White Stripes	Icky Thump	XL	24 June 2007	1	Gold
812	Editors	An End Has a Start	Kitchenware	1 July 2007	1	Platinum
813	The Chemical Brothers	We Are the Night	Virgin	8 July 2007	1	Gold
814	The Enemy	We'll Live and Die in These Towns	Warner Bros.	15 July 2007	1	Platinum
815	Paul Potts	One Chance	Syco	22 July 2007	3	Platinum
816	Kate Nash	Made of Bricks	Fiction	12 August 2007	1	2× Platinum
817	Elvis Presley	The King	RCA	19 August 2007	1	Gold
818	Newton Faulkner	Hand Built by Robots	Ugly Truth	26 August 2007	2	2× Platinum
819	Hard-Fi	Once Upon a Time in the West	Atlantic/Necessary	9 September 2007	1	Gold
820	Kanye West	Graduation	Roc-A-Fella	16 September 2007	1	3× Platinum
821	James Blunt	All the Lost Souls	Custard/Atlantic	23 September 2007	1	3× Platinum
822	Foo Fighters	Echoes, Silence, Patience & Grace	RCA	30 September 2007	1	2× Platinum
823	Bruce Springsteen	Magic	Columbia	7 October 2007	1	Gold
824	Sugababes	Change	Island	14 October 2007	1	Platinum
825	Stereophonics	Pull the Pin	V2	21 October 2007	1	Gold
826	The Hoosiers	The Trick to Life	RCA	28 October 2007	1	2× Platinum
827	Eagles	Long Road out of Eden	Polydor	4 November 2007	1	2× Platinum
828	Westlife	Back Home	S	11 November 2007	1	3× Platinum
829	Leona Lewis	Spirit	Syco	18 November 2007	7	10× Platinum
2008
830	Radiohead	In Rainbows	XL	6 January 2008	1	Platinum
831	Amy Macdonald	This Is the Life	Vertigo	13 January 2008	1	3× Platinum
832	Scouting for Girls	Scouting for Girls	Epic	20 January 2008	2	3× Platinum
833	Adele	19	XL	3 February 2008	1	9× Platinum
834	Jack Johnson	Sleep Through the Static	Brushfire/Island	10 February 2008	2	Gold
835	The Feeling	Join With Us	Island	24 February 2008	1	Gold
836 (Note: Island Records requested to the OCC that the deluxe edition of Back to Black be counted as an entirely separate album from the original.)	Amy Winehouse	Back to Black – The Deluxe Edition	Island	2 March 2008	1	15× Platinum
837	Duffy	Rockferry †	A&M	9 March 2008	4	7× Platinum
838	R.E.M.	Accelerate	Warner Bros.	6 April 2008	1	Gold
re	Duffy	Rockferry †	A&M	13 April 2008	1	7× Platinum
839	The Kooks	Konk	Virgin	20 April 2008	1	Platinum
840	The Last Shadow Puppets	The Age of the Understatement	Domino	27 April 2008	1	Platinum
841	Madonna	Hard Candy	Warner Bros.	4 May 2008	1	Platinum
842	Scooter	Jumping All Over the World	All Around the World/ Universal TV	11 May 2008	1	Platinum
843	Neil Diamond	Home Before Dark	Columbia	18 May 2008	1	Platinum
844	The Ting Tings	We Started Nothing	Columbia	25 May 2008	1	2× Platinum
845	Usher	Here I Stand	LaFace	1 June 2008	1	Gold
846	Paul Weller	22 Dreams	Island	8 June 2008	1	Gold
847	Coldplay	Viva la Vida or Death and All His Friends	Parlophone	15 June 2008	5	5× Platinum
848	Basshunter	Now You're Gone – The Album	Hard2Beat	20 July 2008	1	Platinum
re	Coldplay	Viva la Vida or Death and All His Friends	Parlophone	27 July 2008	1	5× Platinum
re	ABBA	Gold: Greatest Hits	Polydor	3 August 2008	2	23× Platinum
849	The Script	The Script	Phonogenic	17 August 2008	2	4× Platinum
850	The Verve	Forth	Parlophone	31 August 2008	2	Platinum
851	Metallica	Death Magnetic	Vertigo	14 September 2008	2	Platinum
852	Kings of Leon	Only by the Night	Hand Me Down	28 September 2008	2	10× Platinum
853	Oasis	Dig Out Your Soul	Big Brother	12 October 2008	1	2× Platinum
854	Keane	Perfect Symmetry	Island	19 October 2008	1	Platinum
855	AC/DC	Black Ice	Columbia	26 October 2008	1	Platinum
856	Pink	Funhouse	LaFace	2 November 2008	1	4× Platinum
857	Girls Aloud	Out of Control	Fascination	9 November 2008	1	2× Platinum
858	Il Divo	The Promise	Syco	16 November 2008	1	Platinum
re	Leona Lewis	Spirit	Syco	23 November 2008	1	10× Platinum
859	The Killers	Day & Age	Vertigo	30 November 2008	1	4× Platinum
860	Take That	The Circus	Polydor	7 December 2008	5	7× Platinum
2009
re	Kings of Leon	Only by the Night	Hand Me Down	11 January 2009	1	10× Platinum
re	The Script	The Script	Phonogenic	18 January 2009	1	4× Platinum
861	White Lies	To Lose My Life...	Fiction	25 January 2009	1	Gold
862	Bruce Springsteen	Working on a Dream	Columbia	1 February 2009	2	Gold
863	Lily Allen	It's Not Me, It's You	Regal	15 February 2009	1	4× Platinum
re	Kings of Leon	Only by the Night	Hand Me Down	22 February 2009	1	10× Platinum
864	The Prodigy	Invaders Must Die	Take Me to the Hospital	1 March 2009	1	2× Platinum
865	U2	No Line on the Horizon	Island	8 March 2009	2	Platinum
866	Ronan Keating	Songs for My Mother	Polydor	22 March 2009	2	Gold
867	Lady Gaga	The Fame	Interscope	5 April 2009	4	12× Platinum
868	Bob Dylan	Together Through Life	Columbia	3 May 2009	2	Gold
869	Green Day	21st Century Breakdown	Reprise	17 May 2009	1	Platinum
870	Eminem	Relapse	Interscope	24 May 2009	2	2× Platinum
871	Paolo Nutini	Sunny Side Up	Atlantic	7 June 2009	1	6× Platinum
872	Kasabian	West Ryder Pauper Lunatic Asylum	Columbia	14 June 2009	2	3× Platinum
re	Michael Jackson	Number Ones	Epic	28 June 2009	1	10× Platinum
873	Michael Jackson	The Essential Michael Jackson	Epic	5 July 2009	7	8× Platinum
874	Calvin Harris	Ready for the Weekend	Columbia	23 August 2009	1	Platinum
875	Arctic Monkeys	Humbug	Domino	30 August 2009	2	Platinum
876	Vera Lynn	We'll Meet Again: The Very Best of Vera Lynn	Decca	13 September 2009	1	Platinum
877	Muse	The Resistance	Helium 3/Warner Bros.	20 September 2009	1	2× Platinum
878	Madonna	Celebration	Warner Bros.	27 September 2009	1	2× Platinum
879	Paramore	Brand New Eyes	Fueled by Ramen	4 October 2009	1	Platinum
880	Barbra Streisand	Love Is the Answer	Columbia	11 October 2009	1	Gold
881	Editors	In This Light and on This Evening	Kitchenware	18 October 2009	1	Gold
882	Alexandra Burke	Overcome	Syco	25 October 2009	1	2× Platinum
883	Cheryl Cole	3 Words	Fascination	1 November 2009	2	3× Platinum
884	JLS	JLS	Epic	15 November 2009	1	5× Platinum
885	Leona Lewis	Echo	Syco	22 November 2009	1	2× Platinum
886	Susan Boyle	I Dreamed a Dream †	Syco	29 November 2009	4	7× Platinum
887	Michael Bublé	Crazy Love	Reprise	27 December 2009	1	10× Platinum

=== By artist ===
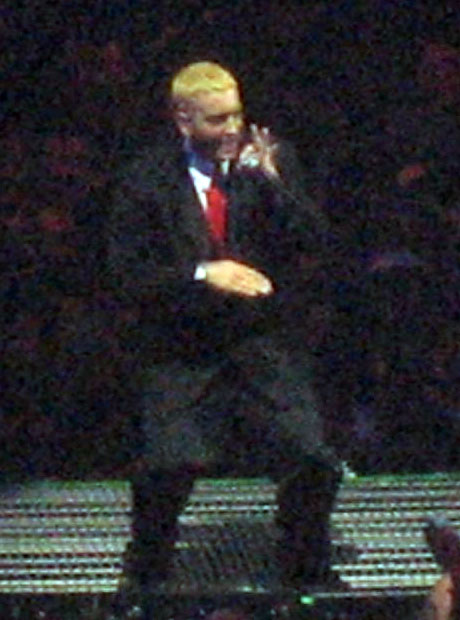
Eminem released five number-one albums during the 2000s.

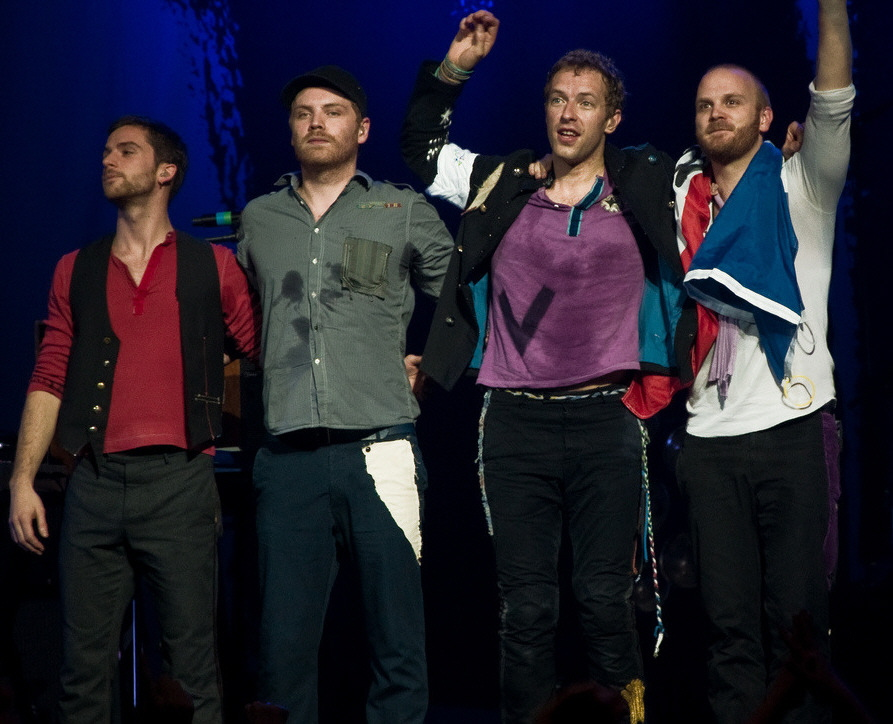
Coldplay topped the chart with four different albums this decade.

Eight artists spent 10 weeks or more at number one on the album chart during the 2000s.

Artist	Number ones	Weeks at number one	Albums
Robbie Williams	6	23	• Sing When You're Winning (2000, three weeks at number one) • Swing When You're Winning (2001, seven weeks) • Escapology (2002–03, seven weeks) • Greatest Hits (2004, four weeks) • Intensive Care (2005, one week) • Rudebox (2006, one week)
Dido	2	17	• No Angel (2001, seven weeks at number one) • Life for Rent (2003–04, ten weeks)
Eminem	5	16	• The Marshall Mathers LP (2000, two weeks at number one) • The Eminem Show (2002, five weeks) • Encore (2004, two weeks) • Curtain Call: The Hits (2005, five weeks) • Relapse (2009, two weeks)
Coldplay	4	14	• Parachutes (2000, one week at number one) • A Rush of Blood to the Head (2002–03, three weeks) • X&Y (2005, four weeks) • Viva la Vida or Death and All His Friends (2008, six weeks)
Take That	2	13	• Beautiful World (2006–07, eight weeks at number one) • The Circus (2008, five weeks)
James Blunt	2	11	• Back to Bedlam (2005–06, ten weeks at number one) • All the Lost Souls (2007, one week)
Travis	2	11	• The Man Who (2000, seven weeks at number one) • The Invisible Band (2001, four weeks)
Michael Jackson	3	10	• Invincible (2001, one week at number one) • Number Ones (2003–09, two weeks) • The Essential Michael Jackson (2009, seven weeks)

=== By record label ===
Eight record labels spent 20 weeks or more at number one on the album chart during the 2000s.

Record label	Number-one albums	Weeks at number one
Polydor Records	13	33
Warner Bros. Records	16	29
Parlophone	13	29
Columbia Records	17	27
Interscope Records	10	25
Syco Music	13	24
Epic Records	9	22
Island Records	12	21

== Christmas number ones ==
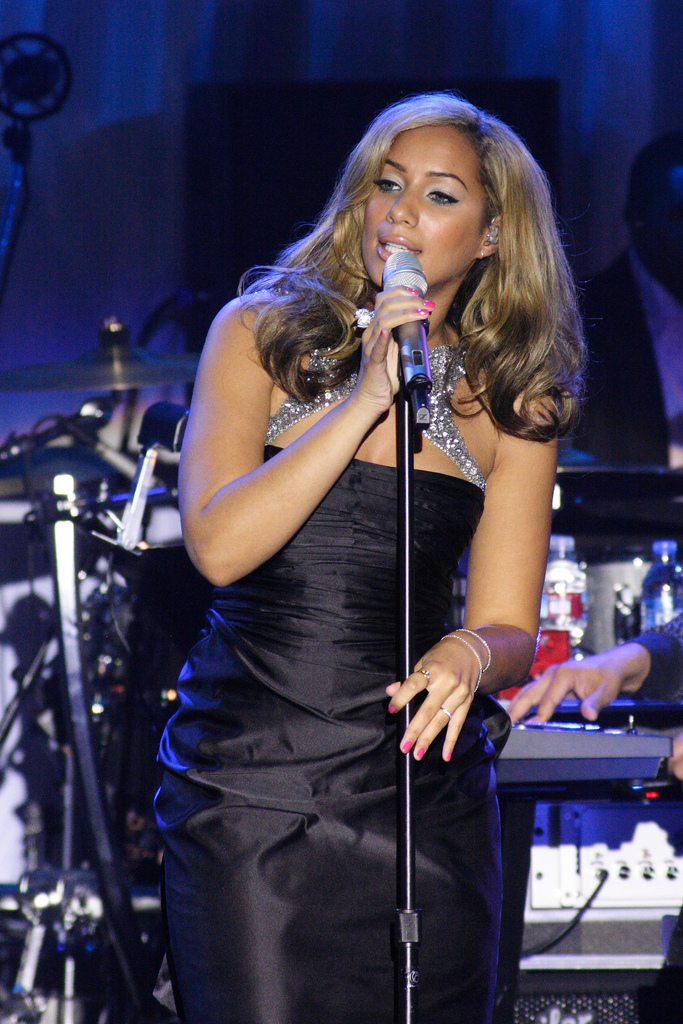
Spirit by Leona Lewis was the 2007 Christmas number-one album.

In the UK, Christmas number one albums are those that are at the top of the UK Albums Chart on Christmas Day. Typically, this will refer to the album that was announced as number one on the Sunday before 25 December—when Christmas Day falls on a Sunday itself, the official number one is considered by the OCC to be the one announced on that day's chart. During the 2000s, the following albums were Christmas number ones.

Year	Artist	Album	Record label	Weeks at number one	Ref.
2000	The Beatles	1	Apple	9	
2001	Robbie Williams	Swing When You're Winning	Chrysalis	7	
2002	Robbie Williams	Escapology	EMI	7	
2003	Dido	Life for Rent	Cheeky	10	
2004	Robbie Williams	Greatest Hits	Chrysalis	4	
2005	Eminem	Curtain Call: The Hits	Interscope	5	
2006	Take That	Beautiful World	Polydor	8	
2007	Leona Lewis	Spirit	Syco	7	
2008	Take That	The Circus	Polydor	5	
2009	Susan Boyle	I Dreamed a Dream	Syco	4	

== See also ==
- List of UK Album Downloads Chart number ones of the 2000s
- List of UK Compilation Chart number ones of the 2000s
