= List of best-selling albums in the United Kingdom =

Top 60 best selling albums in the UK

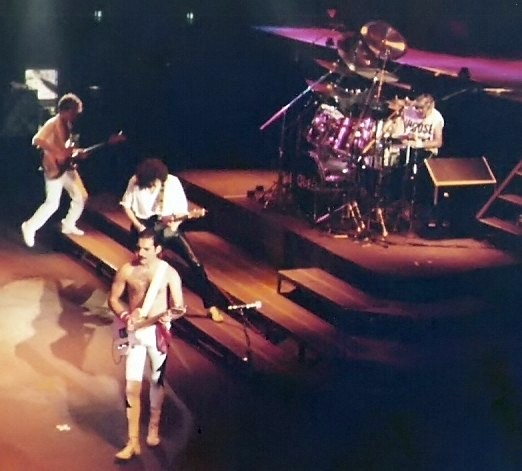
Greatest Hits by the British rock band Queen (pictured) is the best-selling album in the UK.

The best-selling album in the United Kingdom is Greatest Hits, a compilation album by the British rock band Queen that was first released in 1981. As of July 2026, Greatest Hits has sold more than 7.8 million copies in the UK. Of the UK's 70 best-selling albums, more than half are by British artists, with the remaining albums being by artists from the United States, Canada, Sweden, Jamaica and Ireland. Fifteen acts feature on the chart with more than one album, with five featuring three times. The most-represented record label is Epic Records with six entries, while the decade that appears the most is the 2000s, with 24 of the entries having been released during that period, despite its "general background of declining sales and internet piracy".

According to the Official Charts Company (OCC), which collects album sales data in the UK, an album is defined as being a type of music release that features more than four tracks or is longer than 25 minutes in duration. Sales of albums in the UK were first published by the music magazine Record Mirror, who compiled a weekly chart of the country's five biggest-selling records for the week of 22 July 1956. Record Mirror's first number one was Songs for Swingin' Lovers! by Frank Sinatra. Since then, seven albums have gone on to sell more than five million copies each. Album sales have been monitored by the OCC since 1994, when they took over compiling the weekly UK Albums Chart.

Sales certifications for albums are awarded by the British Phonographic Industry (BPI) for shipments, physical sales and downloads of albums, and, as of June 2015, streaming of album tracks. The BPI began awarding certifications soon after it was founded in April 1973. Initially, certifications were based on the revenue received by the album manufacturers – records that generated revenue of £75,000 were awarded silver certification, £150,000 represented gold and £1 million was platinum. Over the following six years, the thresholds for silver and gold certifications both grew twice – the threshold for platinum certification remained at £1 million. In January 1979, this method of certifying sales was abolished, and certifications were instead based on unit sales to retail outlets: sales of 60,000 were awarded silver, gold for 100,000 and platinum for 300,000. Multi-platinum awards were introduced in February 1987; (Note: As an example, a 2× Platinum certification would reflect 2 × 300,000 = 600,000 sales.) digital downloads have been counted towards unit sales since 2004. Certifications for albums released before April 1973 were retroactively awarded in August 2013 for sales from 1994 onwards, and then again in February 2016 for all previous sales. The highest-certified album is Greatest Hits, which has been awarded platinum certification 26 times, representing 7,800,000 units.

== Best-selling albums ==
Positions are as of July 2026; sales, where shown, are from the reference given, which may be at a different date, and cannot be used to infer changes in position.

Best-selling albums in the UK
| No. | Album | Artist | Record label (Note: The record labels, release months and chart peaks are those given by the OCC.) | Released | Chart peak | Sales (Note: Unless otherwise cited, sales are based on the certifications given by the BPI as of November 2026.) | No. of times Platinum (Note: The certifications are those given by the BPI as of November 2026.) |
|---|---|---|---|---|---|---|---|
| 1 | Greatest Hits | Queen | EMI | October 1981 | 1 | 7.8 million | 26× |
| 2 | Gold: Greatest Hits | ABBA | Polydor | September 1992 | 1 | 7.1 million | 23× |
| 3 | (What's the Story) Morning Glory? | Oasis | Creation | October 1995 | 1 | 6.2 million | 19× |
| 4 | 21 | Adele | XL | January 2011 | 1 | 5.7 million | 19× |
| 5 | Sgt. Pepper's Lonely Hearts Club Band | The Beatles | Apple | June 1967 | 1 | 5.6 million | 18× |
| 6 | Rumours | Fleetwood Mac | Warner Bros. | February 1977 | 1 | 5.1 million+ | 17× |
| 7 | The Dark Side of the Moon | Pink Floyd | Harvest | March 1973 | 2 | 5.0 million | 16× |
| 8 | Thriller | Michael Jackson | Epic | November 1982 | 1 | 4.8 million+ | 16× |
| 9 | Legend | Bob Marley and the Wailers | Island/Tuff Gong | May 1984 | 1 | 4.8 million+ | 16× |
| 10 | Brothers in Arms | Dire Straits | Vertigo | May 1985 | 1 | 4.6 million | 15× |
| 11 | Back to Black | Amy Winehouse | Island | October 2006 | 1 | 4.6 million | 15× |
| 12 | Bad | Michael Jackson | Epic | August 1987 | 1 | 4.5 million+ | 15× |
| 13 | ÷ | Ed Sheeran | Asylum | March 2017 | 1 | 4.5 million | 15× |
| 14 | Greatest Hits II | Queen | EMI/Parlophone | October 1991 | 1 | 4.2 million+ | 14× |
| 15 | 25 | Adele | XL | November 2015 | 1 | 4.2 million+ | 14× |
| 16 | x | Ed Sheeran | Asylum | June 2014 | 1 | 3.9 million+ | 13× |
| 17 | 1 | The Beatles | Apple | November 2000 | 1 | 3.9 million+ | 13× |
| 18 | The Immaculate Collection | Madonna | Sire | November 1990 | 1 | 3.9 million+ | 13× |
| 19 | Bat Out of Hell | Meat Loaf | Epic | October 1977 | 3 | 3.6 million+ | 12× |
| 20 | The Fame | Lady Gaga | Interscope | January 2009 | 1 | 3.6 million+ | 12× |
| 21 | Come On Over | Shania Twain | Mercury | November 1997 | 1 | 3.6 million+ | 12× |
| 22 | Curtain Call: The Hits | Eminem | Interscope | December 2005 | 1 | 3.6 million+ | 12× |
| 23 | Stars | Simply Red | East West | September 1991 | 1 | 3.6 million+ | 12× |
| 24 | Urban Hymns | The Verve | Hut | September 1997 | 1 | 3.3 million+ | 11× |
| 25 | Christmas | Michael Bublé | Reprise | November 2011 | 1 | 3.3 million+ | 11× |
| 26 | Back to Bedlam | James Blunt | Atlantic | November 2004 | 1 | 3.3 million+ | 11× |
| 27 | Bridge over Troubled Water | Simon & Garfunkel | CBS | January 1970 | 1 | 3.3 million+ | 11× |
| 28 | Spirit | Leona Lewis | Syco | November 2007 | 1 | 3.0 million+ | 10× |
| 29 | Dirty Dancing | Original soundtrack | RCA | August 1987 | 4 | 3.0 million+ | 10× |
| 30 | Only by the Night | Kings of Leon | Hand Me Down | September 2008 | 1 | 3.0 million+ | 10× |
| 31 | Crazy Love | Michael Bublé | Reprise | October 2009 | 1 | 3.0 million+ | 10× |
| 32 | In the Lonely Hour | Sam Smith | Capitol | June 2014 | 1 | 3.0 million+ | 10× |
| 33 | White Ladder | David Gray | IHT/East West | November 1997 | 1 | 3.0 million+ | 10× |
| 34 | Number Ones | Michael Jackson | Epic | November 2003 | 1 | 3.0 million+ | 10× |
| 35 | No Angel | Dido | Arista | October 2000 | 1 | 3.0 million+ | 10× |
| 36 | A Rush of Blood to the Head | Coldplay | Parlophone | August 2002 | 1 | 3.0 million+ | 10× |
| 37 | The Joshua Tree | U2 | Island | March 1987 | 1 | 3.0 million+ | 10× |
| 38 | Spice | Spice Girls | Virgin | November 1996 | 1 | 3.0 million+ | 10× |
| 39 | Definitely Maybe | Oasis | Creation | August 1994 | 1 | 3.0 million+ | 10× |
| 40 | The Greatest Showman | Motion picture cast recording | Atlantic | December 2017 | 1 | 3.0 million+ | 10× |
| 41 | Nevermind | Nirvana | DGC | September 1991 | 5 | 3.0 million+ | 10× |
| 42 | Hopes and Fears | Keane | Island | May 2004 | 1 | 3.0 million+ | 10× |
| 43 | Jagged Little Pill | Alanis Morissette | Maverick | June 1995 | 1 | 3.0 million+ | 10× |
| 44 | Talk on Corners | The Corrs | Atlantic | October 1997 | 1 | 2.7 million+ | 9× |
| 45 | Beautiful World | Take That | Polydor | November 2006 | 1 | 2.7 million+ | 9× |
| 46 | Jeff Wayne's Musical Version of The War of the Worlds | Jeff Wayne | CBS | June 1978 | 5 | 2.7 million+ | 9× |
| 47 | Life for Rent | Dido | Arista | September 2003 | 1 | 2.7 million+ | 9× |
| 48 | Parachutes | Coldplay | Parlophone | July 2000 | 1 | 2.7 million+ | 9× |
| 49 | X&Y | Coldplay | Parlophone | June 2005 | 1 | 2.7 million+ | 9× |
| 50 | The Marshall Mathers LP | Eminem | Aftermath | May 2000 | 1 | 2.7 million+ | 9× |
| 51 | Tracy Chapman | Tracy Chapman | Elektra | May 1988 | 1 | 2.7 million+ | 9× |
| 52 | Grease | Original soundtrack | Polydor | June 1978 | 1 | 2.7 million+ | 9× |
| 53 | + | Ed Sheeran | Asylum | September 2011 | 1 | 2.7 million+ | 9× |
| 54 | ...But Seriously | Phil Collins | Virgin | November 1989 | 1 | 2.7 million+ | 9× |
| 55 | Scissor Sisters | Scissor Sisters | Polydor | February 2004 | 1 | 2.7 million+ | 9× |
| 56 | Ladies & Gentlemen: The Best of George Michael | George Michael | Epic | November 1998 | 1 | 2.7 million+ | 9× |
| 57 | Tubular Bells | Mike Oldfield | Virgin | May 1973 | 1 | 2.7 million+ | 9× |
| 58 | The Man Who | Travis | Independiente | May 1999 | 1 | 2.7 million+ | 9× |
| 59 | Tango in the Night | Fleetwood Mac | Warner | April 1987 | 1 | 2.7 million+ | 9× |
| 60 | Appetite for Destruction | Guns N' Roses | Polydor/UMR | July 1987 | 5 | 2.7 million+ | 9× |
| 61 | Graceland | Paul Simon | Warner | August 1986 | 1 | 2.7 million+ | 9× |
| 62 | Come Away with Me | Norah Jones | Blue Note | February 2002 | 1 | 2.7 million+ | 9× |
| 63 | 19 | Adele | XL | January 2008 | 1 | 2.7 million+ | 9× |
| 64 | Greatest Hits | Robbie Williams | Chrysalis | October 2004 | 1 | 2.4 million+ | 8× |
| 65 | American Idiot | Green Day | Reprise | September 2004 | 1 | 2.7 million+ | 9× |
| 66 | Abbey Road | The Beatles | Apple | September 1969 | 1 | 2.4 million+ | 8× |
| 67 | Greatest Hits | Guns N' Roses | Geffen | March 2004 | 1 | 2.4 million+ | 8× |
| 68 | I've Been Expecting You | Robbie Williams | Chrysalis | October 1998 | 1 | 3.0 million+ | 10× |
| 69 | Greatest Hits | ABBA | Epic | March 1976 | 1 | 2.4 million+ | 8× |
| 70 | Hot Fuss | The Killers | Vertigo | June 2004 | 1 | 2.4 million+ | 8× |

== See also ==
- List of best-selling albums
- List of best-selling singles in the United Kingdom
