= Sail Away (David Gray song) =

2001 single by David Gray

Single by David Gray

from the album White Ladder
- Released: 16 July 2001
- Length: 5:15
- Label: IHT; EastWest; RCA
- Songwriter: David Gray
- Producers: David Gray; Craig McClune; Iestyn Polson

David Gray singles chronology
"This Year's Love" (2001)	"Sail Away" (2001)	"Say Hello Wave Goodbye" (2001)

"Sail Away" is a song by British singer-songwriter David Gray. It was released as the fourth single from his fourth studio album, White Ladder (1998), on 16 July 2001 and charted at number 26 on the UK Singles Chart, number 31 on the Irish Singles Chart, and number 11 on the US Billboard Triple-A chart. Remixes by Rae and Christian and Biffco were also commissioned and featured on the single formats. The DVD single features live video footage taken from his concert DVD release David Gray: Live.

== Track listings ==
UK CD and cassette single

1. "Sail Away" (Biffco radio edit) – 3:44
2. "Sail Away" (Biffco club mix) – 7:02
3. "Sail Away" (Rae and Christian remix) – 5:35

UK DVD single

1. "Sail Away" (live at the Point video)
2. "Sail Away" (Biffco radio edit audio)
3. "This Year's Love" (live at the Point video excerpt)
4. "Please Forgive Me" (live at the Point video excerpt)
5. "Wisdom" (live at the Point video excerpt)

== Personnel ==
Personnel are lifted from the White Ladder album booklet.

- David Gray – writing, vocals, guitar, piano, keyboards, production
- Craig McClune – bass, keyboards, drums, production
- Iestyn Polson – production
- Marius de Vries – additional production
- Steve Sidelnyk – additional programming

== Charts ==
=== Weekly charts ===
Chart (2001)	Peak position
Europe (Eurochart Hot 100)	88
Ireland (IRMA)	31
Scotland Singles (OCC)	19
UK Singles (OCC)	26
US Adult Alternative Airplay (Billboard)	11

=== Year-end charts ===
Chart (2001)	Position
US Triple-A (Billboard)	40

== Certifications ==
Region	Certification	Certified units/sales
New Zealand (RMNZ)	Platinum	30,000^{‡}
United Kingdom (BPI) Sales since 2004	Platinum	600,000^{‡}
^{‡} Sales+streaming figures based on certification alone.

== Release history ==
Region	Date	Format(s)	Label(s)	Ref.
United Kingdom	16 July 2001	CD; cassette	IHT; EastWest	
United States	23 July 2001	Triple-A radio	RCA	
