= The Pride of Spitalfields =

Pub in the East End of London

Coordinates: 51.51891°N 0.07115°W

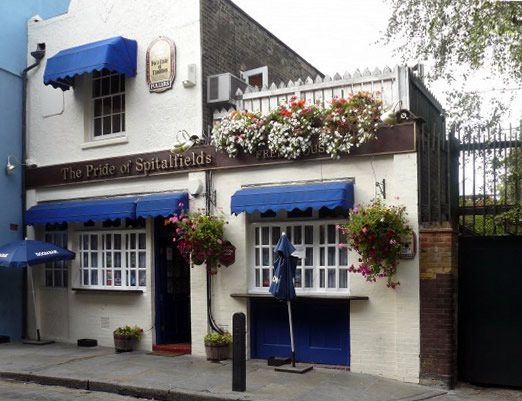
The Pride of Spitalfields

The Pride of Spitalfields (formerly The Romford Arms) is a public house at 3 Heneage Street in Spitalfields in the East End of London, just off Brick Lane. It was associated with a Jack the Ripper suspect.

== History ==
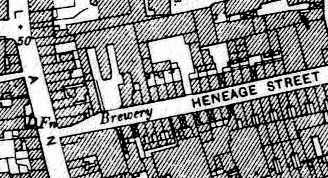
1894 Ordnance Survey Map Extract showing Heneage Street, London E1

The pub has existed since at least the middle of the 19th century, if not always under that name. Heneage Street itself appears to have been created between 1802 and 1822 according to available maps.

In the 1889 Post Office Trade Directory, 3 Heneage Street, on the north side of the road, was listed as a Beer Retailer, with proprietor James Stewart. The adjacent site to the east, 5 Heneage Street, now a house and artist's studio, was the site of the Best & Co. brewery, which closed in 1902.

=== Jack the Ripper ===
One of the suspects named by researchers, James Hardiman, a 'cats meat vendor', lived at 13 Heneage Street, and drank at the Romford Arms.

Another, more notable, witness and Ripper suspect, George Hutchinson, made statements that some researchers have suggested he had been drinking at The Romford Arms on the night of 9 November 1888 prior to meeting one of the victims.

=== Modern era ===
The pub's name changed from The Romford Arms sometime between 1983 and 1986 according to contemporary publications.

David Gray filmed his music video for Sail Away in the pub in 1998.

In 2003, the pub was damaged in a petrol bomb attack.

In 2013, it was awarded "East London Pub of the Year" by CAMRA - the Campaign for Real Ale - an award shared with the Eleanor Arms, Bow.
