= This Year's Love (song) =

1999 single by David Gray

Single by David Gray

from the album White Ladder
- B-side: "Nightblindness", "Over My Head" (1999); "Flame Turns Blue", "The Lights of London", "Roots of Love","Tired of Me" (2001)
- Released: 29 March 1999
- Studio: Air (London, England)
- Length: 4:05
- Label: IHT; EastWest
- Songwriter: David Gray
- Producers: David Gray; Craig McClune; Iestyn Polson

David Gray singles chronology
"Wisdom" (1993)	"This Year's Love" (1999)	"Babylon" (1999)
"Please Forgive Me" (2000)	"This Year's Love" (2001)	"Sail Away" (2001)

Alternative covers
- 2001 re-issue CD1

Alternative cover
- 2001 re-issue CD2

"This Year's Love" is a song by British singer-songwriter David Gray from his fourth studio album, White Ladder (1998). Originally released as the album's first single on 29 March 1999, it was re-issued on 5 March 2001. The single peaked at number 20 on the UK Singles Chart and number 27 on the Irish Singles Chart.

== Track listings ==
UK CD single (1999)

1. "This Year's Love"
2. "Nightblindness"
3. "Over My Head"

UK CD1 and cassette single (2001)

1. "This Year's Love" (Strings remix) – 4:00
2. "Flame Turns Blue" – 3:59
3. "The Lights of London" – 4:43

UK CD2 (2001)

1. "This Year's Love" (16.12.00) – 4:22
2. "Roots of Love" – 4:30
3. "Tired of Me" – 3:42

== Credits and personnel ==
Credits are lifted from the White Ladder album booklet.

Studio

- Recorded and engineered at Air Studios (London, England)

Personnel

- David Gray – writing, vocals, piano, production
- Craig McClune – bass, production
- Tim Bradshaw – keyboards
- Iestyn Polson – production
- Jon Bailey – recording, engineering

== Charts ==
Chart (1999–2001)	Peak position
Europe (Eurochart Hot 100)	73
Ireland (IRMA)	25
Scotland Singles (OCC)	13
UK Singles (OCC)	20

== Certifications ==
Region	Certification	Certified units/sales
New Zealand (RMNZ)	Platinum	30,000^{‡}
United Kingdom (BPI)	Platinum	600,000^{‡}
^{‡} Sales+streaming figures based on certification alone.

== Release history ==
Region	Date	Format(s)	Label(s)	Ref.
United Kingdom	29 March 1999	CD	IHT	
United Kingdom (re-release)	5 March 2001	CD; cassette	EastWest	
