= Spirit (Leona Lewis album) =

Studio album by Leona Lewis
- Released: 9 November 2007
- Recorded: December 2006 – September 2007
- Studios: Air Lyndhurst; Atlantis; Battery; Chalice Recording; Conway Recording; DARP; Doppler; Dr. Luke's; Encore; The Jam Studios; Henson Recording; Homeside 13; Mansfield; Opra Music and Oceanway; Record Plant; Rokstone; Westlake Recording
- Genres: Pop; R&B
- Length: 53:39
- Label: Syco • J
- Producers: Walter Afanasieff; Josh Alexander; Dallas Austin; Kara DioGuardi; Dr. Luke; Eric Hudson; Phillip "Taj" Jackson; The Jam; Akon; Steve Mac; MaddScientist; Novel; Salaam Remi; J. R. Rotem; The Runaways; Stargate; Billy Steinberg; Ryan Tedder; Wayne Wilkins

Leona Lewis chronology
Spirit (2007)	Echo (2009)

Singles from Spirit
- 1. "A Moment Like This" Released: 17 December 2006; 2. "Bleeding Love" Released: 16 September 2007; 3. "Better in Time / Footprints in the Sand" Released: 25 February 2008; 4. "Forgive Me" Released: 26 July 2008; 5. "Run" Released: 30 November 2008; 6. "I Will Be" Released: 6 January 2009

Spirit is the debut studio album by British singer Leona Lewis, released by Syco Music in November 2007 in the United Kingdom and Ireland, followed by a worldwide release during early 2008. The album made Lewis the first UK solo artist to debut at number one with a debut album, in the US, on 26 April 2008. Spirit became the fastest-selling debut album in the UK, at the time of release. It also became the fastest album to sell one million copies by a solo female in the UK. The album remains the best-selling debut album by a female artist in the UK, and is one of the best-selling albums in UK chart history.

After winning the third series of reality singing contest The X Factor in December 2006, Lewis began recording the album in Sweden, the United Kingdom and United States, working with a variety of writers and producers. Critics praised the album for creating a contemporary album using such a variety of producers, and for showcasing Lewis's voice. The release of the album marked Lewis as the first winner of a major television talent show in both the UK and US to be given a major global launch with a debut album.

The album debuted at number one in nine countries, including the United Kingdom, United States and Germany, and peaked in the top five in a further eight countries. It held the record for the biggest digital album sales in a week ever for a new artist. The album was the sixth biggest-selling of 2008 in the world, as according to the IFPI. It has gone on to sell over eight million copies worldwide, and was the fourth best-selling album of the 2000s in the UK, where it has since sold over 3.12 million copies and remains the best-selling debut album by a female artist. In October 2019, Spirit was recognised as the seventh best-selling album of the 21st century in the UK.

Spirit spawned seven singles, including two from a re-release of the album. Lead international single "Bleeding Love" went on to top the charts in 36 countries, becoming one of the best-selling singles by a female of all time. It was nominated for Record of the Year and Best Female Pop Vocal Performance at the 51st Grammy Awards, and British Single of the Year at the 2008 Brit Awards. Follow-up single "Better in Time" also fared well, charting in the top 10 in 13 countries and reaching number 11 in the US. After a well received performance of Snow Patrol's "Run" whilst promoting Spirit, Lewis recorded a cover version for the re-release of the album, titled Spirit – The Deluxe Edition, which was released as a download-only single in the UK, where it charted at number one, going on to be the third Platinum-selling single from Spirit, following X Factor winner's single "A Moment Like This" and "Bleeding Love".

== Background ==
In December 2006, Lewis won the third series of British reality singing contest, The X Factor, her prize being a £1 million recording contract with Sony BMG, for which Simon Cowell is an A&R executive. Cowell also mentored Lewis on the show. During the live final, Lewis duetted with Gary Barlow of band Take That, who told Cowell, "This girl is probably fifty times better than any other contestant you have ever had, so you have a big responsibility to make the right record with her." Cowell admitted that Barlow's words resonated with him, and thus the decision was made to not rush her debut album, as he wanted an "incredible record" of original material, which he believed could not be done in less than a year. Lewis also wanted a high quality album that she could feel proud of. Cowell told Lewis that he did not care if the album took three years to make, he wanted to get it right.

On 25 April 2007, a press release was sent out revealing that Simon Cowell and Clive Davis, chairman and CEO of J Records, would work together in a first-of-its-kind partnership on both the song and producer selection for the album. Lewis performed a showcase for several American music executives at the Beverly Hilton Hotel in Beverly Hills, California. Lewis named the album Spirit because "it is my heart and soul and the voice within that says everything is possible." The album originally had a September 2007 deadline, but was delayed due to Lewis suffering from tonsillitis and waiting for producers to become available.

== Writing and recording ==
Lewis recorded the album in several locations the first being London, England, where she worked with Steve Mac, who produced the songs "Homeless" and "Footprints in the Sand". "Homeless" was written by Jörgen Elofsson, and was originally recorded in 2006 by Swedish singer Darin and featured on his album Break the News. "Footprints in the Sand" was written by Per Magnusson, David Kreuger, Richard Page and Simon Cowell. The song is an adaptation of the Christian poem "Footprints", and Lewis commented "Originally it was a poem; it's very inspirational so we put it into a song. I think it is very moving, with a very emotional lyric and I really love to sing this song". Cowell came up with the idea to base a song around the poem, and asked Kreuger and Magnusson whether they could write something dealing with this subject. They took the idea to a songwriting session the pair already had scheduled with Page at his home in Malibu, California and they finished the song the following day. When Cowell mentioned the song concept to Lewis, she agreed that it could be "really quite interesting".

In Los Angeles, California, Lewis teamed up with OneRepublic singer Ryan Tedder, with whom she recorded two songs, "Bleeding Love" and "Take a Bow". In February 2007, OneRepublic frontman Ryan Tedder and pop singer-songwriter Jesse McCartney had written the song "Bleeding Love" for Departure, McCartney's third studio album. However, his record label, Hollywood Records, did not like the song. Tedder believed it was a "massive" song and the record company was "out of their mind". McCartney wanted to keep it for himself as he had a personal attachment to the song, but it did not work out. Tedder had previously made the decision not to work with contestants from the singing competition American Idol, but he had not heard of The X Factor. After being shown a website about Lewis, he thought that "her voice just sounded unreal," saying that "from a writer's perspective, this girl – with or without a TV show – has one of the best voices I've ever heard." On hearing that Cowell was looking for songs for Lewis's debut album, Tedder rearranged "Bleeding Love", changed the key and tailored it to suit her voice. "Take a Bow" was written and produced by Tedder, Louis Biancaniello, Wayne Wilkins and Sam Watters. Watters and Biancaniello also wrote "Yesterday", with Jordan Omley, Michael Mani, and Nina Woodford. "Better in Time" was recorded in Los Angeles with producer J. R. Rotem, who wrote the song along with Andrea Martin. "I Will Be" is a cover of an Avril Lavigne song, written by Lavigne, Dr. Luke and Max Martin, that was released as an iTunes bonus track and on the Limited edition of her album The Best Damn Thing. "The Best You Never Had" was also record in LA, written and produced by Billy Steinberg and Josh Alexander, "The First Time Ever I Saw Your Face", a cover of the Ewan MacColl song, was recorded in both Atlanta and Los Angeles. It was produced by Wayne Wilkins, Sam Watters and Louis Biancaniello. "I'm You" was recorded in Atlanta with Ne-Yo, "Angel", a Stargate production, was written by Stargate, Espen Lind, Amund Bjørklund and Johnta Austin, and recorded in New York.

Lewis co-wrote "Here I Am" with Walter Afanasieff and Brett James in LA. Lewis wanted to be involved in the writing process, and said that Cowell allowed her to do so as it was "her album". She noted "I've not been given a formula to follow. I had the time to find my feet and co-write a lot of material. I've learned a lot and Simon and Clive really listen to me." In Atlanta, Georgia, Lewis worked with producers Alonzo "Novel" Stevenson and Dallas Austin on the song "Whatever It Takes", which Lewis co-wrote together with Novel and Tony Reyes. In Miami, Florida, Lewis worked with Salaam Remi, and "Forgiveness" was recorded. It was written by Lewis, Remi and Kara DioGuardi. Lewis's debut single, a cover of Kelly Clarkson's "A Moment Like This", is included as a bonus track on releases in the UK, Ireland and Japan. Two new songs were recorded in 2008 to help the album appeal more to an American audience: "Forgive Me", which was written and produced by Akon, and "Misses Glass" written by Mad Scientist and RockCity. In an interview with Digital Spy, Lewis explained "I wanted to do something a bit different and the chance to work with Akon came about. I'm really pleased with how it's turned out and it's great that it's different, rather than what I always do."

== Music and lyrics ==
Commenting on the album's lyrics, Lewis said, "[They] reflect things that I'm really passionate about. I have to be able to put myself in the song for it to ring true to me. If it doesn't ring true to me, it's not going to be believable to anyone else." Lewis described the album's style as "classic songs with a contemporary edge", containing R&B and "fresh pop" styles, ballads and "soulful up-tempo numbers". It has an American style, with some electronic 1980s sounds; however, the songs are not beat-driven or following the latest trends, but are songs that can be performed acoustically.

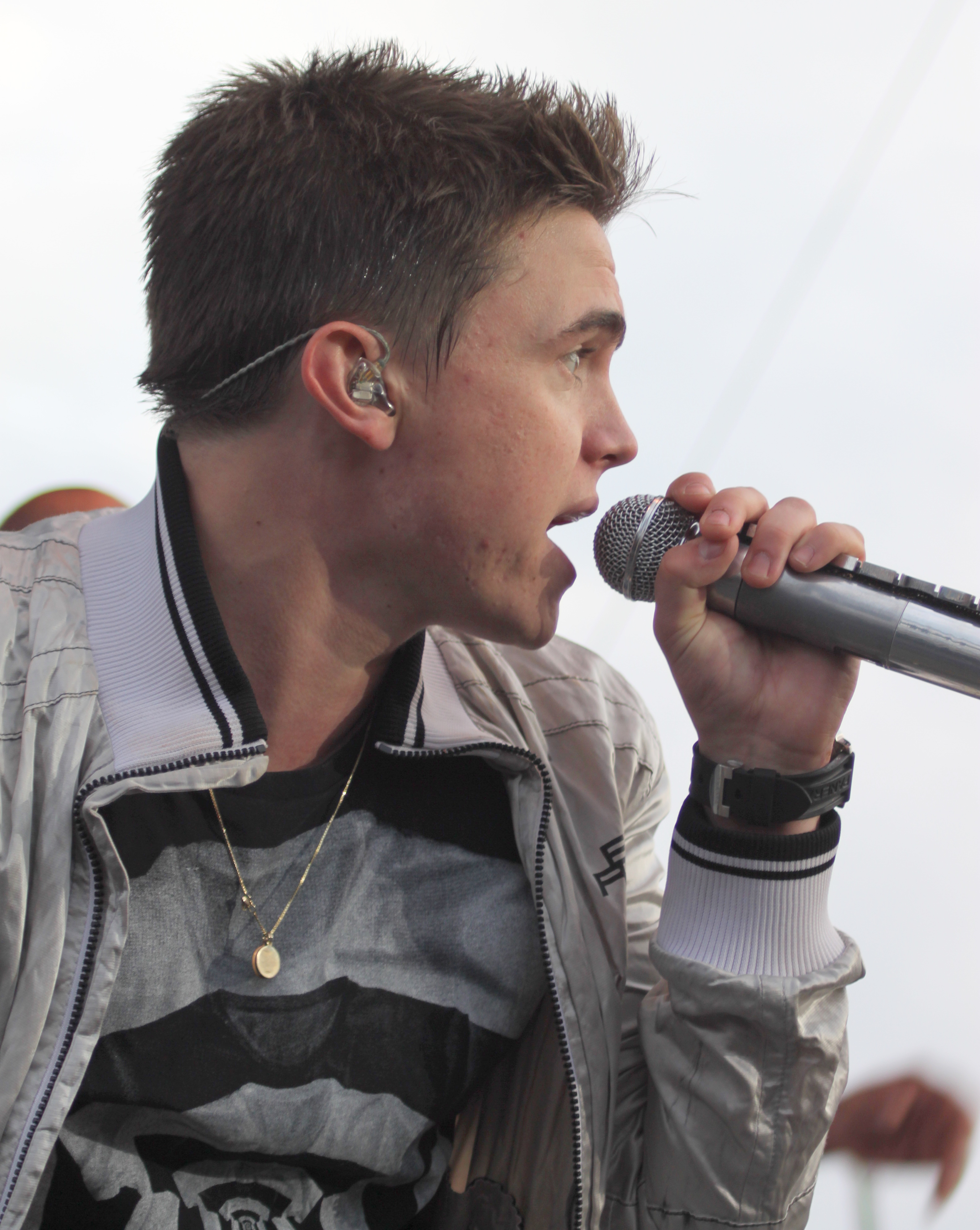
"Bleeding Love" was initially co-written by Jesse McCartney (pictured) for his third album Departure.

Opening track "Bleeding Love" employs a church organ which is audible throughout the song until the bridge. Synthesized strings are also prominent throughout the song, which intermittently integrates wood block percussion throughout the track. A heavy, distorted marching band-like drum loop backs the song. McCartney wrote the song about his longtime girlfriend, and said: "I kept thinking about being in love so much that it hurts. I was away from my girlfriend for four months at the time and I really wanted to [quit] and fly home. I was so in love that it was painful. It was like bleeding, it cut me open." The song refers to someone in a relationship who is extremely blinded by love. Regardless of the numerous warnings from her friends and the fact that she is emotionally hurt by her lover, she continues to love him and accepts the pain. Metaphorically, this is represented in his "cutting her open"; however, all she can do is "bleed love" for him. "Whatever It Takes" was described as a "chipper slice of soul-pop, anchored by a surprisingly bone-shaking beat", followed by "Homeless". "Yesterday" has been described as "a smoochy R&B slow jam". "Better in Time" is a pop and R&B song set in a moderate tempo. Lyrically the song talks about someone who cannot forget her ex-partner, and at the end the protagonist knows that "it will all get better in time". "Footprints in the Sand" incorporates elements of pop and R&B genres, and contains a gospel production performed by the choir and features "crashing drums". It incorporates keyboard instruments, guitar, bass and includes a choir performance by The Tuff Session Singers. The song is about "standing by someone and being there for people who need your help." "Forgive Me" is an R&B, soul and dance-pop song written in A minor. The song refers to a protagonist in a one-sided relationship who leaves her boyfriend and eventually finds someone to reciprocate her love. Though she has found love from someone else, she defends herself and asks her ex-boyfriend for forgiveness.

== Singles ==
Syco managing director, Sonny Takhar, initially expected at least five singles to be released from the record, stating "every track is a potential single – we really are spoiled for choice." Spirit spawned seven singles, two of which came from Spirit – The Deluxe Edition. "A Moment Like This" was available as a digital download in the UK and Ireland from midnight on 17 December 2006, after Lewis won the third series of The X Factor, followed by a CD release on 20 December. It became the fastest selling UK single when it was downloaded more than 50,000 times within thirty minutes of release. On 24 December, "A Moment Like This" was crowned the 2006 UK Christmas number-one single, and it stayed at number one in the UK Singles Chart for four weeks and in the Irish Singles Chart for six weeks. It was the second biggest selling single of 2006, behind Gnarls Barkley's Crazy, and went on to be certified platinum by the British Phonographic Industry.

"Bleeding Love" was released in October 2007 in the UK and Ireland, followed by a worldwide release in early 2008. It entered the UK Singles chart at number one with sales of 218,000 copies, which was the biggest first-week sales of 2007 to date. It stayed at number one for seven weeks in the UK, and reached number one in a further thirty-three countries, including the United States, where Lewis became the first British solo female to reach number one since Kim Wilde's "You Keep Me Hangin' On" in 1987. Written by Jesse McCartney and Ryan Tedder, the song was planned for McCartney's third solo album, but his record label did not like it, so Tedder rearranged the song to fit Lewis's voice. The song was well received by critics, who praised Lewis's vocal performance. It was nominated for Record of the Year and Best Female Pop Vocal Performance at the 51st Grammy Awards, and British Single at the 2008 BRIT Awards.

"Better in Time" was Lewis's second worldwide single, released in March 2008 in the UK and during spring and summer throughout the rest of the world. In the UK it was released as a double A-side with "Footprints in the Sand", in aid of Sport Relief. The single reached a peak of number two in the UK, and was certified silver by the BPI. It peaked within the top ten in a further thirteen countries, and at number eleven in the Billboard Hot 100. The song received positive reception from critics, and was nominated for British Single at the 2009 BRIT Awards. "Forgive Me" was released between July and November 2008 throughout Europe, Australia, New Zealand and Japan, and was the first single from the re-release of Spirit. Critics praised the change in direction for her, although the lyrical content was criticised. It reached number five in the UK, and also peaked within the top ten in Ireland, Italy, Sweden and Turkey.

"Run" was released as a download-only single in the UK and Ireland in November 2008, and later worldwide. Lewis first performed "Run" on the Live Lounge section of The Jo Whiley Show, where artists perform two songs: one song of their own and one by another artist, in an acoustic format. After positive fan reaction Lewis decided to record a studio version for the re-release of her album. Critics praised her version, which spent two weeks atop the UK Singles chart, giving Lewis her third UK number one. It also reached the number one spot in Austria and Ireland, and reached the top ten of Finland, Germany and Switzerland. The finale single "I Will Be" was released in January 2009, only in North America; it peaked at number 66 on the Billboard Hot 100 and number 83 in Canada.

== Release and promotion ==
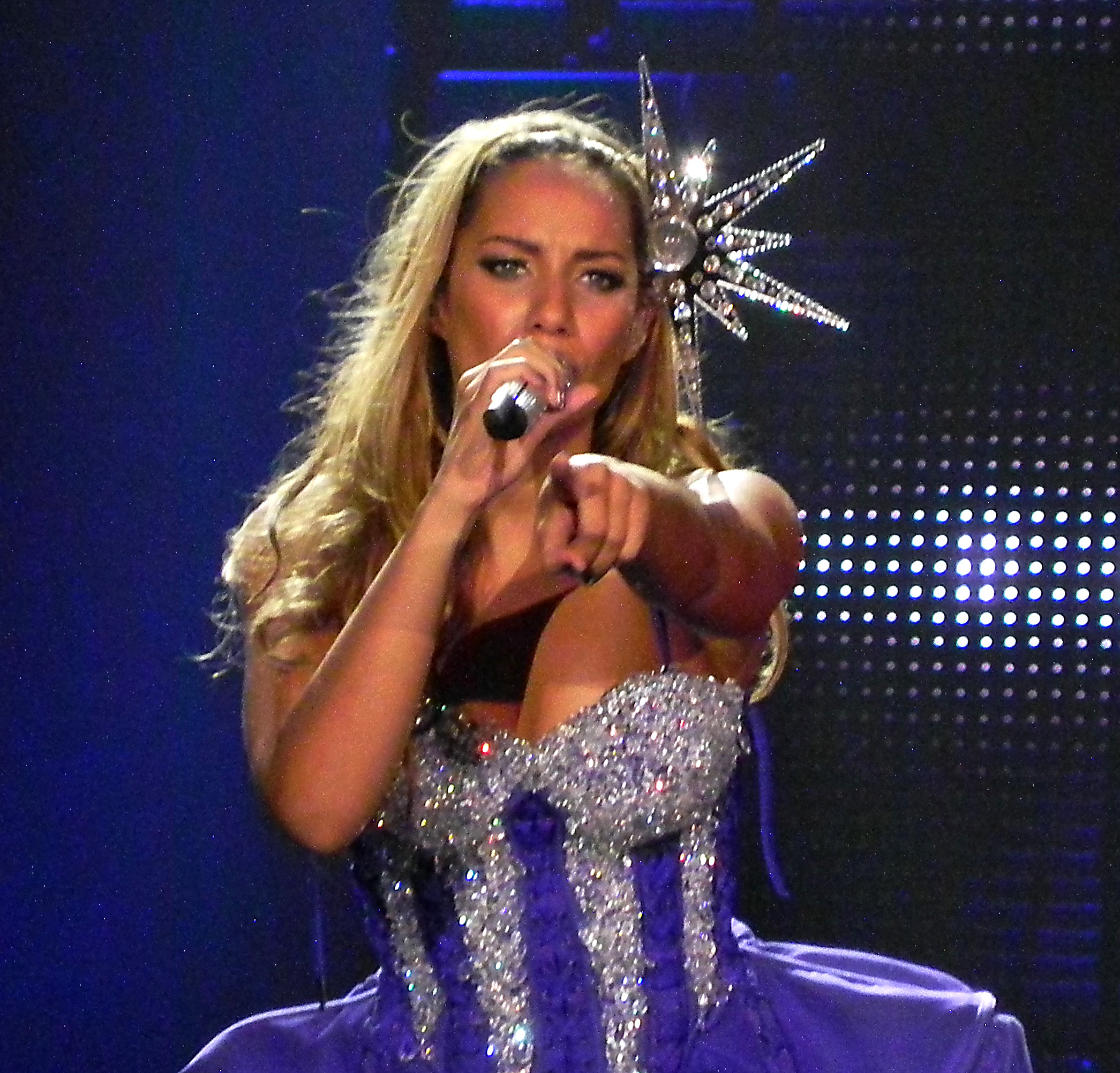
Lewis performing "Bleeding Love" as the closing number on The Labyrinth tour in 2010

The release of the album marked Lewis as the first winner of a major television talent show to be given a global launch with a debut album. Spirit was re-released on 17 November 2008 in the UK following the release of "Forgive Me". It also features "Misses Glass" from the American version of the album, and Lewis's cover of Snow Patrol's "Run". In addition to the extra tracks, the deluxe featured a DVD containing all of Lewis's music videos to date except the video for "Run". The deluxe edition was released on 3 February 2009 in the US, including two out of three of her b-sides as well as the single mix for "Run", which is 34 seconds shorter than the international album version. The accompanying DVD includes all of Lewis's music videos, with the exception of "A Moment Like This", along with a live video of "I Will Be".

On 24 September 2007, Lewis performed a special album launch party at the Mandarin Oriental Hotel in Knightsbridge, London. She performed "Bleeding Love", "The First Time Ever I Saw Your Face", "Homeless" and "Whatever It Takes". Lewis went on a two-day UK regional radio tour to promote the album and single "Bleeding Love" on 11 and 12 October. This was followed by an appearance on This Morning on 15 October. Lewis performed "Bleeding Love" live on the fourth series of The X Factor on 20 October 2007. From 29 October 2007, Spirit was BBC Radio 2's Album of the Week. In November 2007 she performed "Bleeding Love" and a cover of the Snow Patrol song "Run" on BBC Radio 1's Live Lounge show. Lewis performed "Bleeding Love" and "The First Time Ever I Saw Your Face" on Saturday Night Divas. During February and March 2008, Lewis promoted the album in Europe. In February, Lewis made her American TV performance debut on The Oprah Winfrey Show singing "Bleeding Love". Then through the course of late March and early April Lewis carried out a large scale promotional tour throughout America appearing and performing on TV shows including The Tonight Show with Jay Leno, The Ellen DeGeneres Show, Jimmy Kimmel Live!, Tyra Banks Show, Good Morning America, Late Show with David Letterman and TRL, with a performance in late April on American Idol followed by a promotional tour of Australia.

In November 2009, dates in the United Kingdom and Ireland were confirmed for her debut concert tour, entitled The Labyrinth, supporting both Spirit and her second album Echo.

== Critical reception ==
Professional ratings
Aggregate scores
Source	Rating
Metacritic	65/100
Review scores
Source	Rating
AllMusic	3.5/5 stars
BBC Music	mixed
Entertainment Weekly	C+
The Guardian	2/5 stars
IGN	8/10 stars
MSN Music (Consumer Guide)	B
The New York Times	mixed
Slant Magazine	3/5 stars
The Times	2/5 stars
Yahoo! Music UK	8/10 stars

Spirit received positive reviews from most music critics upon its release. At Metacritic, which assigns a normalised rating out of 100 to reviews from mainstream critics, the album received an average score of 65, based on 13 reviews, which indicates "generally favourable reviews". IGN's Chad Grischow described Spirit as the "perfect showcase for [Lewis'] fantastic skills", praising her ability to sing both upbeat tracks and "tender piano ballads". Chris Elwell-Sutton of the Evening Standard said that Spirit will be "a very successful album with some much-needed grit." Digital Spy's Nick Levine gave the album four out of five stars, claiming that although Lewis had a palette of different producers working with her, they managed to prevent her from sounding "too fusty or old-fashioned." Stephen Thomas Erlewine of Allmusic said "Lewis can hit those big notes but make it seem easy, never straining her voice and building nicely to the climax. Unlike most divas, there is a human quality to her voice, as she's singing to the song, not singing to her voice." He compared it to Mariah Carey's debut album, but criticised the old-fashioned sound. Popjustice's review was brief, summing up that "[Spirit] has four absolutely blinding tracks on it, three far better than average tracks on it, and some others which are quite good. There are no totally chronic songs on Spirit apart from 'A Moment Like This'." The Boston Globe's Sarah Rodman praised Lewis's ability to make unremarkable songs sound impressive, saying "The tracks are impeccably manicured, super-tuneful, and offer lyrics about the various agonies and ecstasies of love that are unremarkable in and of themselves but reach nuclear-threat levels of desperation thanks to Lewis's voice."

In the mixed reviews critics generally praised Lewis's voice but criticised the music. Lyndsey Winship from BBC Music complimented Lewis's vocal ability but perceived a lack of "hooks, innovation and personality". On Lewis's vocals Robert Christgau commented "The subtle flutter of her finest melismatics could give an open-minded person goose bumps. Her coarser melismatics, however, are the usual showoff BS and probably also a commercial prerequisite, like not having a harelip." Sal Cinquemani of Slant Magazine praised Lewis's voice but criticised the mixture of styles within the album. The New York Times's Nate Chinen felt the album did not live up to the standards of lead single "Bleeding Love", but was successful in showcasing Lewis's vocal capabilities. Caroline Sullivan of The Guardian was disappointed, saying "[Lewis] has clearly invested every scrap of energy into these songs [...] but being able to belt 'em out is only half the story, and if there's a personality here, it's well hidden." Victoria Segal of The Times praised Lewis's voice, but criticised the music, saying "[Lewis] has a powerful voice but on Spirit it seems to have paralysed her collaborators creatively. Instead of taking the opportunity to craft it into new and exciting shapes, it has been stuck in a big spotlit display case, revolving slowly and rather boringly on a velvet cushion of overstuffed balladry." She concluded by saying, "If Lewis is looking for the greatest love of all – public adoration – she will have to do better than this."

Mark Beaumont, writing for NME in 2016, included it on his list of eight of the all-time best-selling albums in the UK have no redeeming features whatsoever, criticizing how derivative it is of Whitney Houston, Snow Patrol and Coldplay.

=== Accolades ===
At the 2008 BRIT Awards Lewis was nominated for four awards, including British Album of the Year for Spirit, and was the favourite to win most awards, however she walked away empty handed. She garnered three nominations at the 51st Grammy Awards including Best Pop Vocal Album. At the 2008 Music of Black Origin Awards Spirit won the MOBO award for Best Album and Lewis was nominated for Best UK Female. The album was nominated in the 2008 MTV Europe Music Awards Album of the Year category, whilst Lewis won Best UK + Ireland Act and was nominated for Act of 2008 and Europe's Favourite Act. Spirit won Best Album 2008 at the Urban Music Awards, and was nominated for Worst Album at the NME Awards. In December 2008 Lewis was named Top New Artist by Billboard magazine. Additionally, Lewis was nominated for Breakout Artist at the 2008 Teen Choice Awards, won the World Music Awards for Best New Artist and Best Pop Female, and was awarded the Shooting Star Bambi Award.

== Commercial performance ==
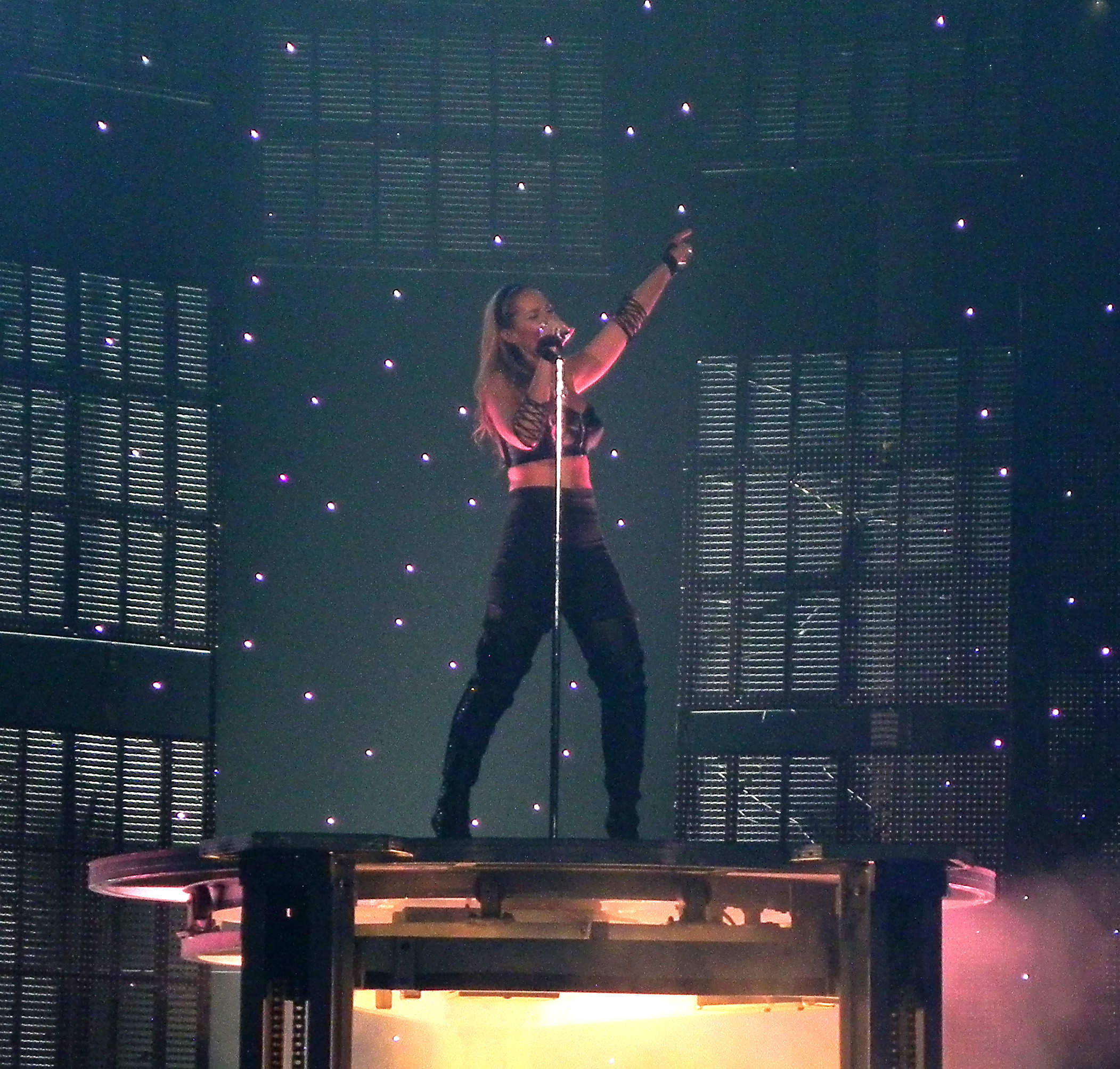
Lewis performing "Run" on The Labyrinth in 2010

On 19 November 2007, Spirit debuted on the UK Albums Chart at number one with first-week sales of 375,872 copies, making it the fastest selling debut album in the UK, beating Arctic Monkeys' Whatever People Say I Am, That's What I'm Not (2006) by 12,000 copies, until the release of Susan Boyle's debut album I Dreamed a Dream in November 2009, which sold 410,000 copies in its first week. It was the fourth fastest selling album of all time, behind Be Here Now (Oasis, 1997), X&Y (Coldplay, 2005) and Life for Rent (Dido, 2003). The album remained at number one for seven weeks, and reached one million sales after 29 days, making it the fastest album to sell one million copies by a solo female in the UK. Spirit was the second biggest selling album of 2007 in the UK, behind Back to Black (Amy Winehouse, 2006). For each of the first seven weeks it sold over 100,000 copies, a record which was later equalled by JLS (JLS, 2009), and beaten by 21 (Adele, 2011), which sold over 100,000 copies for twelve weeks. On 23 November 2008, the album returned to number one for a week, following the release of the deluxe version of the album. In the UK Spirit was the fourth best-selling album of the 2000s, and is the twentieth best-selling album of all time. The album has been certified ten-times platinum by the British Phonographic Industry, with sales of 3.1 million by December 2014. It is the 4th best selling album of the millennium in the UK, and as of November 2015 has sold 3,132,668 copies in the UK.

Spirit entered the Irish Albums Chart at number one, making it the fastest selling debut album ever, beating the Arctic Monkeys by a margin of 6,000 sales. The album remained at the top of the chart for two weeks before being knocked off by Shayne Ward's Breathless. It was the biggest selling album in 2007, and the fourth best selling album in 2008. The standard version of the album has been certified seven-times platinum, and the deluxe version four-times platinum. In February 2008, the album debuted at number one on both the Australian ARIA Chart and the New Zealand RMNZ chart and went on to be certified platinum in Australia and double platinum in New Zealand. In Germany the album spent one week at the top spot, and went on to be certified triple-gold for shipments of 300,000 copies. Spirit also topped the Austrian and Swiss charts, reaching certifications of platinum and double-platinum respectively. It was certified four-times platinum by the International Federation of the Phonographic Industry for sales of more than four million copies in Europe.

In the US, Spirit debuted at number one on the Billboard 200, selling 205,000 copies in its first week, becoming Lewis' highest-peaking album in the United States to date and the highest-charting debut for a British female solo artist on the Billboard 200 in the Nielsen SoundScan era, beating the record previously held by Joss Stone, whose album Introducing Joss Stone had debuted at number two in week dated 7 April 2007, which made Lewis the first British solo artist to top the chart with a debut album, and the first British female to hit number one with an album in over twenty years when Sade Adu topped the chart in February 1986 with Promise. As of 30 June 2008 the album has been certified platinum. The album also reached number one in Canada and was certified platinum on 30 May 2008. According to the IFPI, Spirit was the sixth best selling album of 2008, and has gone on to sell over seven million copies worldwide.

== Track listing ==
International standard edition
No.	Title	Writer(s)	Producer(s)	Length
1.	"Bleeding Love"	Ryan Tedder; Jesse McCartney	Ryan Tedder	4:23
2.	"Whatever It Takes"	Tony Reyes; Leona Lewis; Alonzo "Novel" Stevenson	Dallas Austin; Novel	3:27
3.	"Homeless"	Jörgen Elofsson	Steve Mac	3:50
4.	"Better in Time"	Jonathan Rotem; Andrea Martin	J. R. Rotem	3:54
5.	"Yesterday"	Sam Watters; Louis Biancaniello; Nina Woodford; Jordan Omley; Michael Mani	The JAM; The Runaways	3:54
6.	"Take a Bow"	Watters; Biancaniello; Wayne Wilkins; Tedder	The Runaways; Wilkins; Tedder	3:54
7.	"I Will Be"	Avril Lavigne; Max Martin; Lukasz Gottwald	Dr. Luke	3:59
8.	"Angel"	Mikkel Storleer Eriksen; Tor Erik Hermansen; Espen Lind; Amund Bjørklund; Johntá Austin	StarGate	4:14
9.	"Here I Am"	Walter Afanasieff; Brett James; Lewis	Walter Afanasieff	4:52
10.	"I'm You"	Shaffer Smith; Eric Hudson	Eric Hudson	3:48
11.	"The Best You Never Had"	Billy Steinberg; Josh Alexander	Steinberg; Alexander	3:43
12.	"The First Time Ever I Saw Your Face"	Ewan MacColl	Wilkins; The Runaways	4:26
13.	"Footprints in the Sand"	Richard Page; Per Magnusson; David Kreuger; Simon Cowell	Mac	4:09

Australian re-issue bonus track
No.	Title	Writer(s)	Producer(s)	Length
14.	"Forgive Me"	Aliuane Thiam; Claude Kelly; Giorgio Tuinfort	Akon	3:39

UK and Irish bonus track
No.	Title	Writer(s)	Producer(s)	Length
14.	"A Moment Like This"	Elofsson; John Reid	Mac	4:17

Japanese bonus tracks
No.	Title	Writer(s)	Producer(s)	Length
15.	"Forgiveness"	Lewis; Salaam Remi; Kara DioGuardi	Salaam Remi; DioGuardi	4:19
16.	"You Bring Me Down"	Lewis; Remi; Phillip "Taj" Jackson	Remi; Jackson	3:54

2008 deluxe edition
No.	Title	Writer(s)	Producer(s)	Length
4.	"Better in Time" (single mix)	Rotem; A. Martin	Rotem	3:52
13.	"Footprints in the Sand" (single mix)	Page; Magnusson; Kreuger; Cowell	Mac	3:56
14.	"A Moment Like This"	Elofsson; John Reid	Mac	4:17
15.	"Forgive Me"	Thiam; Kelly; Tuinfort	Akon	3:39
16.	"Misses Glass"	Theron Thomas; Terry Thomas II	MaddScientist	3:40
17.	"Run"	Gary Lightbody; Jonathan Quinn; Mark McClelland; Nathan Connolly; Iain Archer; Jacknife Lee	Steve Robson	5:12

Japanese deluxe edition bonus tracks
No.	Title	Writer(s)	Producer(s)	Length
4.	"Better in Time" (single mix)	Rotem; A. Martin	Rotem	3:52
13.	"Footprints in the Sand" (single mix)	Page; Magnusson; Kreuger; Cowell	Mac	3:56
14.	"A Moment Like This"	Elofsson; John Reid	Mac	4:17
15.	"Forgiveness"	Lewis; Remi; DioGuardi	Remi; DioGuardi	4:19
16.	"You Bring Me Down"	Lewis; Remi; Phillip "Taj" Jackson	Remi; Jackson	3:54
17.	"Forgive Me"	Thiam; Kelly; Tuinfort	Akon	3:39
18.	"Misses Glass"	Thomas; Thomas II	MaddScientist	3:40
19.	"Run"	Lightbody; Quinn; McClelland; Connolly; Archer; Lee	Robson	5:12

Deluxe edition bonus DVD
No.	Title	Director	Length
1.	"Bleeding Love" (UK version)	Melina Matsoukas	4:23
2.	"Bleeding Love" (US version)	Jessy Terrero	4:38
3.	"Better in Time"	Sophie Muller	3:58
4.	"Footprints in the Sand"	Sophie Muller	3:59
5.	"Forgive Me"	Wayne Isham	3:28
6.	"A Moment Like This"	JT	4:17

North American edition
No.	Title	Writer(s)	Producer(s)	Length
1.	"Bleeding Love"	Tedder; McCartney	Tedder	4:22
2.	"Better in Time"	Rotem; A. Martin	Rotem	3:54
3.	"I Will Be"	M. Martin; Lavigne; Gottwald	Dr. Luke	3:58
4.	"I'm You"	Smith; Hudson	Hudson	3:47
5.	"Forgive Me"	Thiam; Kelly; Tuinfort	Akon	3:39
6.	"Misses Glass"	Thomas; Thomas II	MaddScientist	3:40
7.	"Angel"	Eriksen; Hermansen; Lind; Bjørklund; J. Austin	StarGate	4:14
8.	"The First Time Ever I Saw Your Face"	MacColl	Wilkins; The Runaways	4:25
9.	"Yesterday"	Watters; Biancaniello; Woodford; Omley; Mani	The JAM; The Runaways	3:53
10.	"Whatever It Takes"	Reyes; Lewis; Stevenson	D. Austin; Novel	3:27
11.	"Take a Bow"	Watters; Biancaniello; Wilkins; Tedder	The Runaways; Wilkins; Tedder	3:53
12.	"Footprints in the Sand"	Page; Magnusson; Kreuger; Cowell	Mac	4:07
13.	"Here I Am"	Afanasieff; James; Lewis	Afanasieff	4:50

Switzerland digital re-issue bonus track
No.	Title	Writer(s)	Producer(s)	Length
14.	"Bleeding Love" (Jason Nevins extended remix)	Tedder; McCartney	Tedder; Jason Nevins (remix)	6:01

North American iTunes Store bonus tracks
No.	Title	Writer(s)	Producer(s)	Length
14.	"The Best You Never Had"	Steinberg; Alexander	Steinberg; Alexander	3:42
15.	"You Bring Me Down"	Lewis; Remi; Jackson	Remi; Jackson	3:54
16.	"Bleeding Love" (US version) (music video)			4:38
17.	"Bleeding Love" (Jason Nevins extended remix) (pre-order only)	Tedder; McCartney	Tedder; Nevins (remix)	6:01

North American deluxe edition bonus tracks
No.	Title	Writer(s)	Producer(s)	Length
2.	"Better in Time" (single mix)	Rotem; A. Martin	Rotem	3:52
12.	"Footprints in the Sand" (single mix)	Page; Magnusson; Kreuger; Cowell	Mac	3:56
14.	"Myself" (with Novel)	Stevenson; Justin E. Boykin; Graham N. Marsh	Novel	3:50
15.	"Run" (single mix)	Lightbody; Quinn; McClelland; Connolly; Archer; Lee	Robson	4:37
16.	"Forgiveness"	Lewis; Remi; DioGuardi	Remi; DioGuardi	4:20
17.	"Bleeding Love" (Jason Nevins rockin' radio mix)	Tedder; McCartney	Tedder; Nevins (remix)	3:41

North American deluxe edition bonus DVD
No.	Title	Director	Length
1.	"Bleeding Love" (US version)	Jessy Terrero	4:38
2.	"Bleeding Love" (UK version)	Melina Matsoukas	4:22
3.	"Better in Time"	Sophie Muller	3:57
4.	"Footprints in the Sand"	Sophie Muller	3:52
5.	"Forgive Me"	Wayne Isham	3:28
6.	"Run"	Jake Nava	4:50
7.	"I Will Be"	Sophie Muller	4:26

== Personnel ==
Credits adapted from Allmusic.

Vocals

- Tawatha Agee – choir
- Ravaughn Brown – background vocals
- Robin Clark – choir
- Michelle Cobbs – choir
- Benny Diggs – choir
- Tavia Ivey – background vocals
- Leona Lewis – lead vocals, background vocals
- Tammy Lucas – choir
- Cindy Mizelle – choir
- Billy Porter – choir
- Vaneese Thomas – choir
- Fonzi Thornton – choir, vocal contractor

Musicians

- Walter Afanasieff – keyboards
- Josh Alexander – guitar, keyboards
- Dave Arch – organ, piano
- Louis Biancaniello – keyboards
- Amy Chang – violin
- Jack Daley – bass
- Mikkel Storleer Eriksen – instrumentation
- Stephen Ferrera – drums
- Karen Freer – celli
- Eric Hudson – instrumentation
- Daniel Laufer – celli
- Chris Laws – drums
- Espen Lind – guitar
- Phillip Lowman – drums
- Steve Mac – keyboards, synthesizer
- Max Martin – piano
- John Paricelli – guitar
- Steve Pearce – bass
- William Pu – violin
- Tony Reyes – guitar
- J.R. Rotem – instrumentation
- Olga Shpitko – violin
- Alonzo "Novel" Stevenson – keyboards
- Ian Thomas – drums
- Wayne Wilkins – keyboards
- Steven Wolf – drums, percussion

Production

- John Adams – assistant
- Walter Afanasieff – arranger, producer, programming
- Josh Alexander – digital editing, engineer, producer, programming
- Chris Lord-Alge – mixing
- Dave Arch – string arrangements
- Dallas Austin – producer
- Matt Beckley – producer
- Haydn Bendall – string engineer
- Tom Bender – assistant, mixing assistant
- Louis Biancaniello – engineer, mixing, producer, programming
- Chris Brooke – vocal engineer
- David Campbell – string arrangements
- David Channing – engineer
- Lloyd Cooper – assistant
- Simon Cowell – executive producer
- Clive Davis – executive producer
- Rich Davis – production co-ordination
- Craig Durrance – engineer
- Mikkel Storleer Eriksen – engineer
- Geoff Foster – string arrangements
- Chris Garcia – digital editing, engineer
- Serban Ghenea – mixing
- Tyler Gordon – digital editing, programming
- Aniela Gottwald – assistant
- Tatiana Gottwald – engineer
- Keith Gretlein – engineer
- Mick Guzauski – mixing
- Janne Hansson – engineer
- Nate Hertweck – assistant
- Chris Holmes – engineer
- Eddie Horst – string arrangements
- Josh Houghkirk – assistant
- Eric Hudson – producer
- James Ingram – assistant
- Jaycen Joshua – mixing
- Rouble Kapoor – engineer
- Nik Karpen – assistant
- Chris Laws – digital editing, editing, engineer
- Carlton Lynn – engineer, mixing
- Doug McKean – engineer
- Steve Mac – arranger, producer
- Graham Marsh – producer, engineer
- Vlado Meller – mastering
- Greg Ogan – engineer
- Leon Pendarvis – string arrangements, string conductor
- Dave Pensado – mixing
- Trent Privat – assistant
- Daniel Pursey – engineer
- Tim Roberts – assistant
- Scott Roewe – digital editing
- J.R. Rotem – arranger, producer
- Wesley Seidman – engineer
- Robert Smith – engineer
- Chris Soper – engineer
- Billy Steinberg – producer
- Alonzo "Novel" Stevenson – producer, programming
- Tim Sturges – assistant, assistant engineer
- Ren Swan – engineer, mixing
- Tom Syrowski – engineer
- Phil Tan – mixing
- Ryan Tedder – producer
- Aliaune "Akon" Thiam – producer
- Giorgio Tuinfort – producer
- Seth Waldmann – engineer
- Sam Watters – engineer, mixing, producer, vocal producer
- Josh Wilbur – engineer
- Wayne Wilkins – engineer, mixing, producer, programming
- Steven Wolf – producer
- Emily Wright – engineer, production co-ordination

== Charts ==
=== Weekly charts ===
Chart (2007–10)	Peak position
Australian Albums (ARIA)	1
Austrian Albums (Ö3 Austria)	1
Belgian Albums (Ultratop Flanders)	5
Belgian Albums (Ultratop Wallonia)	21
Canadian Albums (Billboard)	1
Danish Albums (Hitlisten)	3
Dutch Albums (Album Top 100)	4
European Albums (Billboard)	3
Finnish Albums (Suomen virallinen lista)	14
French Albums (SNEP)	21
German Albums (Offizielle Top 100)	1
Greek Albums (IFPI)	3
Hungarian Albums (MAHASZ)	22
Icelandic Albums (Tónlistinn)	10
Irish Albums (IRMA)	1
Italian Albums (FIMI)	5
Japanese Albums (Oricon)	5
Mexican Albums (Top 100 Mexico)	69
New Zealand Albums (RMNZ)	1
Norwegian Albums (VG-lista)	10
Polish Albums (ZPAV)	4
Portuguese Albums (AFP)	12
South African Albums (RISA)	9
South Korean International Albums (Circle)	38
Spanish Albums (Promusicae)	26
Swedish Albums (Sverigetopplistan)	2
Swiss Albums (Schweizer Hitparade)	1
Taiwanese Albums (Five Music)	5
UK Albums (Official Charts)	1
UK R&B Albums (Official Charts)	1
US Billboard 200	1

=== Year-end charts ===
Chart (2007)	Position
Irish Albums (IRMA)	1
UK Albums (OCC)	2

Chart (2008)	Position
Australian Albums (ARIA)	14
Austrian Albums (Ö3 Austria)	16
Belgian Albums (Ultratop Flanders)	24
Belgian Albums (Ultratop Wallonia)	80
Canadian Albums (Billboard)	13
Dutch Albums (Album Top 100)	29
European Albums (Billboard)	4
French Albums (SNEP)	68
German Albums (Offizielle Top 100)	12
Greek Albums (IFPI)	19
Hungarian Albums (MAHASZ)	81
Irish Albums (IRMA)	4
Italian Albums (FIMI)	27
Japanese Albums (Oricon)	70
New Zealand Albums (RMNZ)	21
Swedish Albums (Sverigetopplistan)	30
Swiss Albums (Schweizer Hitparade)	9
UK Albums (OCC)	4
US Billboard 200	19
Worldwide Albums (IFPI)	6

Chart (2009)	Position
Austrian Albums (Ö3 Austria)	59
European Albums (Billboard)	30
Swiss Albums (Schweizer Hitparade)	40
UK Albums (OCC)	48
US Billboard 200	102

Chart (2010)	Position
UK Albums (OCC)	153

=== Decade-end charts ===
Chart (2000–2009)	Position
UK Albums (OCC)	4

== Certifications and sales ==
Region	Certification	Certified units/sales
Australia (ARIA)	Platinum	70,000^{^}
Austria (IFPI Austria)	Platinum	20,000^{*}
Belgium (BRMA)	Gold	15,000^{*}
Canada (Music Canada)	Platinum	100,000^{^}
France (SNEP)	Gold	75,000^{*}
Germany (BVMI)	3× Platinum	600,000^{‡}
Greece (IFPI Greece)	Gold	7,500^{^}
Hungary (MAHASZ)	Gold	3,000^{^}
Ireland (IRMA)	7× Platinum	105,000^{^}
Italy Sales in 2008	—	100,000
Italy (FIMI)	Gold	35,000^{*}
Japan (RIAJ)	Gold	100,000^{^}
Netherlands (NVPI)	Gold	35,000^{^}
New Zealand (RMNZ)	2× Platinum	30,000^{‡}
Poland (ZPAV)	Gold	10,000^{*}
Portugal (AFP)	Gold	10,000^{^}
Russia (NFPF)	Gold	10,000^{*}
Sweden (GLF)	Gold	20,000^{^}
Switzerland (IFPI Switzerland)	2× Platinum	60,000^{^}
United Kingdom (BPI)	10× Platinum	3,100,000
United States (RIAA)	Platinum	1,000,000^{^}
Summaries
Europe (IFPI)	4× Platinum	4,000,000^{*}
^{*} Sales figures based on certification alone.^{^} Shipments figures based on certification alone.^{‡} Sales+streaming figures based on certification alone.

== Release history ==
Standard edition
Region	Date	Label	Format	Catalogue
Ireland	9 November 2007	Syco Music	CD, digital download	88697185262
United Kingdom	12 November 2007	Syco Music	CD, digital download	88697185262
Sweden	23 January 2008	Sony BMG	CD, digital download	88697222432
New Zealand	25 January 2008	Sony BMG	CD, digital download	88697222432
Italy	25 January 2008	Sony BMG	CD, digital download	88697222432
Taiwan	25 January 2008	Sony BMG	CD, digital download	88697222432
Germany	25 January 2008	Sony BMG	CD, digital download	88697222432
Switzerland	25 January 2008	Sony BMG	CD, digital download	88697222432
Korea	25 January 2008	Sony BMG	CD, digital download	8803581113907
Australia	26 January 2008	Sony BMG	CD, digital download	88697222432
Hong Kong	28 January 2008	Sony BMG	CD, digital download	88697222432
Greece	28 January 2008	Sony BMG	CD, digital download	88697222432
Poland	28 January 2008	Sony BMG	CD, digital download	88697222432
Singapore	28 January 2008	Sony BMG	CD, digital download	88697222432
Spain	19 February 2008	Sony BMG	CD, digital download	886972224329
France	10 March 2008	Sony BMG	CD, digital download	88697222432
China	10 March 2008	Sony BMG	CD, digital download	9787799427188A
Mexico	24 March 2008	Sony BMG	CD, digital download	886972224329
United States	8 April 2008	J Records	CD, digital download	88697025542
Canada	8 April 2008	Sony BMG	CD, digital download	88697025542
Japan	23 April 2008	BMG Japan	CD / CD+DVD	BVCP24129
Brazil	24 April 2008	Sony BMG	CD	88697222432

Deluxe edition
Region	Date	Label	Format	Catalogue
Australia	8 November 2008	Sony BMG	CD / CD+DVD	88697359692
Europe	14 November 2008	Sony BMG	CD / CD+DVD	
Latin America	14 November 2008	Sony BMG	CD / CD+DVD	
United Kingdom	17 November 2008	Syco Music	CD / CD+DVD	
Mexico	17 November 2008	Sony BMG	CD / CD+DVD	
Japan	19 November 2008	BMG Japan	CD / CD+DVD	
United States	3 February 2009	J Records	CD / CD+DVD	
Canada	3 February 2009	Sony BMG	CD / CD+DVD	

== See also ==
- List of best-selling albums
- List of number-one albums of 2008 (Australia)
- List of number-one albums of 2008 (Canada)
- List of number-one albums of 2007 (Ireland)
- List of number-one albums of 2008 (New Zealand)
- List of UK Albums Chart number ones of the 2000s
- List of Billboard 200 number-one albums of 2008
- List of best-selling albums in the United Kingdom
- List of best-selling albums of the 2000s (decade) in the United Kingdom
- List of best-selling albums of the 2000s (century) in the United Kingdom
