= Babylon (David Gray song) =

1999 single by David Gray

Single by David Gray

from the album White Ladder
- B-side: 1999: "Lead Me Upstairs" (live), "New Horizons" (live); 2000: "Tell Me More Lies", "Over My Head"
- Released: 12 July 1999
- Length: 4:25 (album version); 3:40 (single version)
- Label: IHT; EastWest
- Songwriter: David Gray
- Producers: David Gray; Iestyn Polson; Craig McClune

David Gray singles chronology
"This Year's Love" (1999)	"Babylon" (1999)	"Please Forgive Me" (1999)
"Please Forgive Me" (1999)	"Babylon" (2000)	"Please Forgive Me" (2000)

"Babylon" is a song by British singer-songwriter David Gray. Originally released on 12 July 1999 as the second single from his fourth album, White Ladder (1998), it was re-released as the album's fourth single on 19 June 2000. Described as Gray's signature song, "Babylon" is "about a love that is lost and found again".

"Babylon" peaked at number five on the UK Singles Chart on re-release in June 2000 and, eventually, received a platinum certification from the British Phonographic Industry (BPI) in January 2021. The single also charted in the United States, peaking at number 57 on the Billboard Hot 100 and number one on the Billboard Triple-A chart. In February 2021, for the 25th anniversary of the latter chart, Billboard ranked the song sixth on its list of the 100 most successful songs in the chart's history.

A remix titled "Babylon II" appears exclusively on the US version of the album. One B-side of the 2000 re-release, "Over My Head", also appears on the Japanese pressing of the album as a bonus track.

== Music videos ==
Two videos were produced to accompany the song. Version one was released in 2000 and directed by Kieran Evans. It features David Gray singing directly into the camera as it pans from right to left across a number of scenes throughout the city of London at nighttime. A second, and stylistically similar, video was also released which shows Gray performing the song intercut with live concert footage and street scenes in San Francisco.

== Track listings ==
UK CD single (1999)

1. "Babylon"
2. "Lead Me Upstairs" (live at the Temple Bar Music Centre, Dublin, on 16 December 1998)
3. "New Horizons" (live at the Temple Bar Music Centre, Dublin, on 16 December 1998)

UK CD and cassette single (2000); Australian CD single

1. "Babylon" (radio mix one)
2. "Tell Me More Lies"
3. "Over My Head"

European CD single

1. "Babylon" (radio mix one)
2. "Tell Me More Lies"

== Personnel ==
Personnel are taken from the 2000 UK CD single liner notes and the White Ladder album booklet.

- David Gray – writing, vocals, guitar, piano, production
- Craig McClune – drums, vocals, bass, production
- Tim Bradshaw – keyboards
- Iestyn Polson – production, programming, engineering
- Phil Knott – cover photo
- Yumi Matote – design

== Charts ==
=== Weekly charts ===
Chart (2000–2001)	Peak position
Australia (ARIA)	51
Europe (Eurochart Hot 100)	24
Germany (GfK)	96
Ireland (IRMA)	31
Netherlands (Single Top 100)	81
New Zealand (Recorded Music NZ)	31
Scotland Singles (OCC)	4
UK Singles (OCC)	5
US Billboard Hot 100	57
US Adult Alternative Airplay (Billboard)	1
US Adult Contemporary (Billboard)	26
US Adult Pop Airplay (Billboard)	8
US Alternative Airplay (Billboard)	25
US Pop Airplay (Billboard)	36

=== Year-end charts ===
Chart (2000)	Position
UK Singles (OCC)	78
US Adult Top 40 (Billboard)	88
US Triple-A (Billboard)	7

Chart (2001)	Position
US Adult Top 40 (Billboard)	30
US Modern Rock Tracks (Billboard)	94
US Triple-A (Billboard)	11

== Certifications ==
Region	Certification	Certified units/sales
New Zealand (RMNZ)	Platinum	30,000^{‡}
United Kingdom (BPI)	Platinum	600,000^{‡}
^{‡} Sales+streaming figures based on certification alone.

== Release history ==
Region	Date	Format(s)	Label(s)	Ref.
United Kingdom	12 July 1999	CD	IHT	
United Kingdom (re-release)	19 June 2000	CD; cassette	EastWest	
United States	28 August 2000	Hot adult contemporary; modern adult contemporary radio	RCA	
United States	24 October 2000	Contemporary hit radio	RCA	
