= List of best-selling albums of the 21st century in the United Kingdom =

The UK Albums Chart is a music chart compiled by the Official Charts Company (OCC) that calculates the best-selling albums of the week in the United Kingdom. Initially based solely on the sales of albums in the vinyl and CD formats, digital albums began being included from April 2006. Since March 2015, the chart has also been based on audio streaming figures, however the OCC still compiles a 'sales' (only) chart and still quotes these traditional sales figures in its features and articles.

This is a list of the 50 best-selling albums in the UK from 1 January 2000 onwards, as compiled by the OCC (sales that occurred before 2000 are not included). Of these, only two were originally released before the year 2000: White Ladder (1998) by David Gray and Gold: Greatest Hits (1992) by ABBA.

Back to Bedlam by James Blunt, which was the best-selling album of the 2000s decade, was also the best-selling album of the 21st century until August 2011 when it was passed in sales by Amy Winehouse's Back to Black, following Winehouse's death the previous month. Less than four months later, however, Back to Black was itself overtaken by Adele's 21. As of 2026, 21 remains the biggest-selling album in the UK since 2000 (and second best-selling ever), having sold 6 million copies.

== Best-selling albums since 2000 ==
Sales figures from the OCC on the date given in the reference. The OCC differentiate 'chart sales' (which include streaming) from 'sales' (which are downloads and physical purchases and are quoted below).

No.	Title	Artist	Peak position	Year of release	Copies sold (where available)	No. of times Platinum (Note: The certifications are those given by the BPI as of July 2023.)
1	21	Adele	1	2011	5,400,000	18×
2	Back to Black	Amy Winehouse	1	2006	4,200,000	14×
3	25	Adele	1	2015	3,560,000	11×
4	1	The Beatles	1	2000	3,230,000	11×
5	x	Ed Sheeran	1	2014	3,380,000	11×
6	Back to Bedlam	James Blunt	1	2004	3,370,000	11×
7	÷	Ed Sheeran	1	2017	3,300,000	11×
8	Spirit	Leona Lewis	1	2007	3,180,000	10×
9	Crazy Love	Michael Bublé	1	2009	3,150,000	10×
10	No Angel	Dido	1	2000	3,090,000	10×
11	White Ladder	David Gray	1	1998†; 2000 (re-release)	3,040,000	10×
12	A Rush of Blood to the Head	Coldplay	1	2002	3,031,882	10×
13	The Fame	Lady Gaga	1	2008	3,000,000	10×
14	Only by the Night	Kings of Leon	1	2008	3,000,000	10×
15	Number Ones	Michael Jackson	1	2003	3,000,000	10×
16	Life for Rent	Dido	1	2003	2,900,000	9×
17	Beautiful World	Take That	1	2006	2,880,000	9×
18	Gold: Greatest Hits	ABBA	1	1992†	2,569,600	9×
19	Hopes and Fears	Keane	1	2004	2,860,000	9×
20	X&Y	Coldplay	1	2005	2,829,776	9×
21	Christmas	Michael Bublé	1	2011	2,780,000	9×
22	Parachutes	Coldplay	1	2000	2,780,836	9×
22	Scissor Sisters	Scissor Sisters	1	2004	2,760,000	9×
24	Come Away with Me	Norah Jones	1	2002	2,540,000	8×
25	The Marshall Mathers LP	Eminem	1	2000	2,440,000	8×
26	In the Lonely Hour	Sam Smith	1	2014	2,400,095	8×
27	+	Ed Sheeran	1	2011	2,400,000	8×
28	Greatest Hits	Robbie Williams	1	2004	2,320,000	8×
29	Eyes Open	Snow Patrol	1	2004	2,418,438	8×
30	Never Forget – The Ultimate Collection	Take That	2	2005	2,360,000	8×
31	19	Adele	1	2008	2,450,000	8×
32	Swing When You're Winning	Robbie Williams	1	2001	2,430,000	8×
33	Progress	Take That	1	2010	2,375,300	8×
34	Our Version of Events	Emeli Sandé	1	2012	2,260,000	8×
35	Hot Fuss	The Killers	1	2004	2,153,500	7×
36	American Idiot	Green Day	1	2004	2,150,000	7×
37	Rockferry	Duffy	1	2008	2,220,000	7×
38	The Circus	Take That	1	2008	2,210,000	7×
39	Sing When You're Winning	Robbie Williams	1	2000	2,203,321	7×
40	Whatever People Say I Am, That's What I'm Not	Arctic Monkeys	1	2006	2,100,000	7×
41	Curtain Call: The Hits	Eminem	1	2005	2,100,000	7×
42	Greatest Hits	Guns N' Roses	1	2004	1,947,000	7×
43	Escapology	Robbie Williams	1	2002	2,075,441	6×
44	Employment	Kaiser Chiefs	1	2005	2,048,500	6×
45	Songs About Jane	Maroon 5	1	2004	2,081,000	6×
46	Loud	Rihanna	1	2010	2,060,064	6×
47	Good Girl Gone Bad	Rihanna	1	2007	2,021,000	6×
48	By the Way	Red Hot Chili Peppers	1	2002	2,020,000	6×
49	The Very Best of Fleetwood Mac	Fleetwood Mac	1	2002	2,032,000	6×
50	Justified	Justin Timberlake	1	2002	1,975,000	6×
51	Stripped	Christina Aguilera	2	2002	1,980,000	6×
52	The Greatest Hits	Texas	1	2000	1,974,890	6×
53	I Dreamed a Dream	Susan Boyle	1	2009	1,938,305	6×
54	Born to Do It	Craig David	1	2000	1,860,000	6×
55	The Platinum Collection	Queen	2	2000	1,831,000	6×
56	ELV1S: 30 No. 1 Hits	Elvis Presley	1	2004	1,861,800	6×
57	Call Off the Search	Katie Melua	1	2004	1,900,000	6×
58	Legend	Bob Marley and the Wailers	1	1984†	1,825,000	6×
59	Sunny Side Up	Paolo Nutini	1	2009†	1,824,000	6×
60	Unbreakable – The Greatest Hits Volume 1	Westlife	1	2002	1,896,765	6×
61	Demon Days	Gorillaz	1	2005	1,894,803	6×
62	AM	Arctic Monkeys	1	2013	1,800,000	6×

†Originally released before 2000; position based on sales since 2000

== See also ==
- List of best-selling singles of the 2000s (century) in the United Kingdom
- List of best-selling albums of the 2000s (decade) in the United Kingdom
- List of best-selling albums of the 2010s in the United Kingdom
