= Please Forgive Me (David Gray song) =

1999 single by David Gray

Single by David Gray

from the album White Ladder
- Released: 22 November 1999
- Length: 5:35
- Label: IHT; EastWest
- Songwriter: David Gray
- Producers: David Gray; Craig McClune; Iestyn Polson

David Gray singles chronology
"Babylon" (1999)	"Please Forgive Me" (1999)	"Babylon" (2000)
"Babylon" (2000)	"Please Forgive Me" (2000)	"This Year's Love" (2001)

Alternative covers
- US promo CD cover

"Please Forgive Me" is a song by British singer-songwriter David Gray from his fourth album, White Ladder (1998). The song was originally released on 22 November 1999, then re-issued on 16 October 2000. On its first release in November 1999, it reached No. 72 on the UK Singles Chart, while the 2000 re-issue peaked at No. 18.

== Background ==
David Gray said in an interview that the inspiration of the song came from "nowhere." Paul Hartnoll of Orbital was commissioned to remix the song. The remixed version was pressed as 10-inch and 12-inch promos and was featured as the "record of the week" on Pete Tong's Essential Selection, gaining massive airplay in Ibiza.

== Track listings ==
UK CD single (1999)

1. "Please Forgive Me" (twelve inch version)
2. "Please Forgive Me" (Paul Hartnoll remix)

UK (2000) and Australian CD single

1. "Please Forgive Me" (radio edit)
2. "Please Forgive Me" (Paul Hartnoll remix)
3. "Babylon" (live at the Point, Dublin, 22 December 1999)
4. "Please Forgive Me" (enhanced video)

== Personnel ==
Personnel are lifted from the White Ladder album booklet.

- David Gray – writing, vocals, guitar, piano, keyboards, production
- Craig McClune – bass, keyboards, drums, production
- Iestyn Polson – production, programming, engineering

== Charts ==
=== Weekly charts ===
Chart (2000–2001)	Peak position
Australia (ARIA)	186
Europe (Eurochart Hot 100)	79
Ireland (IRMA)	26
Scotland Singles (OCC)	15
UK Singles (OCC)	18
US Adult Alternative Airplay (Billboard)	10
US Adult Pop Airplay (Billboard)	23

=== Year-end charts ===
Chart (2001)	Position
US Adult Top 40 (Billboard)	70
US Triple-A (Billboard)	26

== Certifications ==
Region	Certification	Certified units/sales
United Kingdom (BPI)	Silver	200,000^{‡}
^{‡} Sales+streaming figures based on certification alone.

== Release history ==
Region	Date	Format(s)	Label(s)	Ref.
United Kingdom	22 November 1999	12-inch vinyl; CD	IHT	
United Kingdom (re-release)	16 October 2000	CD; cassette	EastWest	
Australia	6 August 2001	CD	IHT; EastWest	
