= List of best-selling albums of the 2000s (decade) in the United Kingdom =

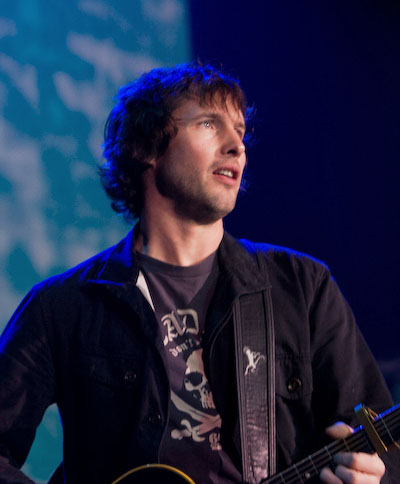
James Blunt's debut album Back to Bedlam was the best-selling album of the 2000s in the United Kingdom, shipping nearly 3.2 million copies.

The UK Albums Chart is a music chart compiled by the Official Charts Company that calculates the best-selling albums of the week in the United Kingdom. Since 2005, it has been based on the sales of both physical and digital albums, on the condition that the album was available in both formats. In 2007, the rules were changed so that legal downloads of all albums, irrespective of whether a physical copy was available, were eligible to chart.

Between 2000 and 2009, more than 100 albums sold more than 1 million copies in the United Kingdom. At the end of the decade, a retrospective chart was compiled by the Official Charts Company to determine the best-selling artist album of this ten-year period. The title was won by James Blunt, with his debut album Back to Bedlam, released in 2004. The album sold 3.19 million copies, finishing ahead of Dido's album No Angel, which sold 3.05 million copies. Dido featured twice in the top 10 best-sellers, with Life for Rent being the seventh best-seller of the decade. Amy Winehouse (3), Leona Lewis (4) and David Gray (5) were the other solo-artists to feature. The Beatles' compilation album 1 was the highest entry by a group in the chart at number 6; Coldplay (8), Keane (9) and Scissor Sisters (10) made up the rest of the top ten. Robbie Williams had the most albums on the list with five entries.

BBC Radio 1 announced the chart in a programme, presented by DJ Nihal, on 28 December 2009. The list of the best-selling albums of the decade in the United Kingdom was also announced in a series of three shows between 29 and 31 December 2009. As it was broadcast during the last week of December, the chart did not include sales from the final week of the year. An updated chart, including sales up to 31 December 2009 and containing some minor changes from the chart broadcast on Radio 1, was published in the UK trade magazine Music Week in the issue dated 30 January 2010.

The list of the best-selling compilation albums of the decade in the UK Compilation Chart was dominated by the Now That's What I Call Music! series of albums. The best-selling compilation album of the 2000s was Now 47 with 1,371,324 copies sold, ahead of Now 50 with 1,367,380 copies. The best-selling soundtrack album of the decade was Mamma Mia! The Movie Soundtrack, with a total of 1,320,357 to the end of 2009.

== Best-selling albums ==
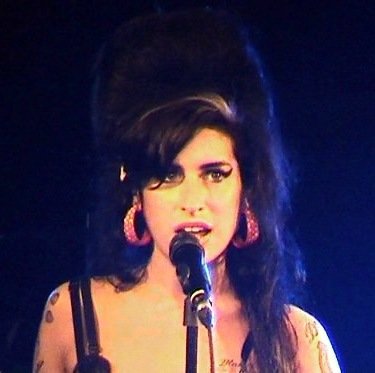
Amy Winehouse had the third best-selling album of the decade with Back to Black, which later became the UK's best-selling album of the 21st century (only to later be overtaken by Adele's 21).

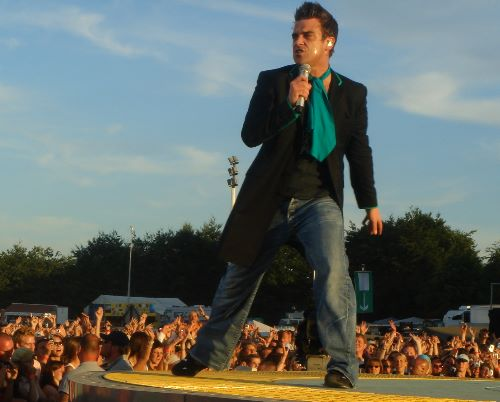
Robbie Williams had the most entries in the top 100 best-selling albums chart with five. Swing When You're Winning charted at number 17, followed by Greatest Hits (19), Sing When You're Winning (20), Escapology (22) and Intensive Care (55).

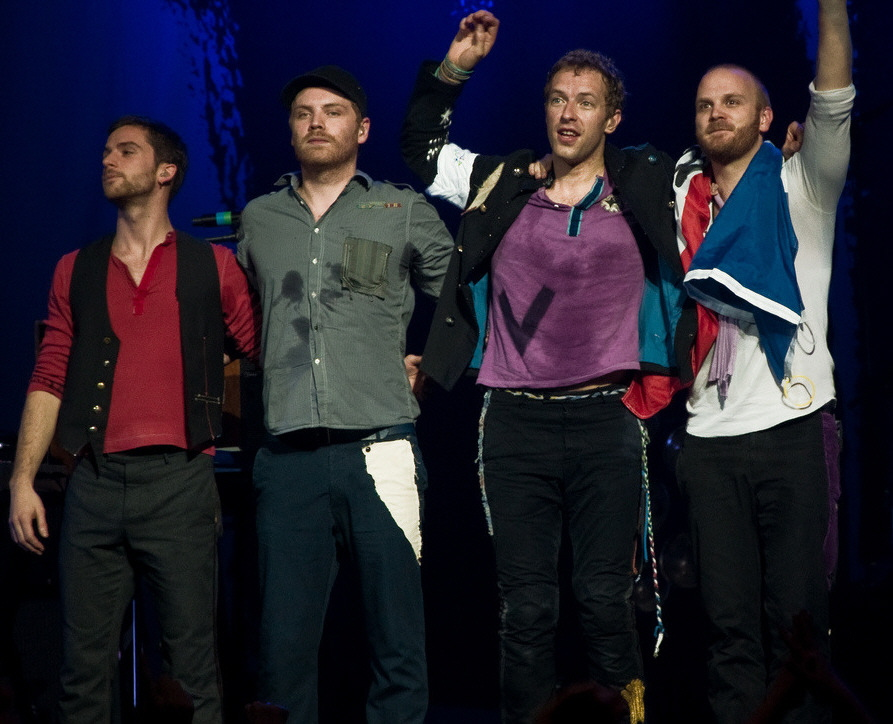
Coldplay had four entries in the chart: A Rush of Blood to the Head (8), X&Y (12), Parachutes (13) and Viva la Vida or Death and All His Friends (90).

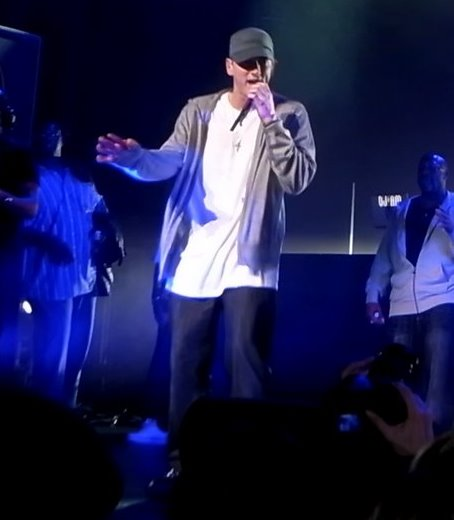
Eminem had three albums on the list. The Marshall Mathers LP was the 16th best-selling album, while The Eminem Show (61) and Curtain Call: The Hits (89) also appeared.

No.	Title	Artist	Peak position	Year of release	Sales
1	Back to Bedlam	James Blunt	1	2004	3,191,393
2	No Angel	Dido	1	2000	3,052,901
3 (Note: The updated chart of the best-selling albums of the decade published in Music Week in January 2010 placed Back to Black at number 19. It appears likely that this position is for sales of the standard edition of the album only. A "deluxe edition" was released in November 2007 and was initially classified as a separate album, with its own chart positions (also peaking at number 1) and its own sales and award certifications. Sales for the two versions were later combined and subsequent reported sales figures for Back to Black are for the standard and deluxe editions combined.)	Back to Black	Amy Winehouse	1	2006	
4	Spirit	Leona Lewis	1	2007	
5	White Ladder	David Gray	1	1998	
6	1	The Beatles	1	2000	2,867,152
7	Life for Rent	Dido	1	2003	
8	A Rush of Blood to the Head	Coldplay	1	2002	
9	Hopes and Fears	Keane	1	2004	
10	Scissor Sisters	Scissor Sisters	1	2004	2,707,567
11	Beautiful World	Take That	1	2006	
12	X&Y	Coldplay	1	2005	
13	Parachutes	Coldplay	1	2000	
14	Come Away with Me	Norah Jones	1	2002	
15	Eyes Open	Snow Patrol	1	2006	
16	The Marshall Mathers LP	Eminem	1	2000	
17	Swing When You're Winning	Robbie Williams	1	2001	
18	Only by the Night	Kings of Leon	1	2008	2,260,195
19	Greatest Hits	Robbie Williams	1	2004	
20	Sing When You're Winning	Robbie Williams	1	2000	
21	Rockferry	Duffy	1	2008	
22	Escapology	Robbie Williams	1	2002	
23	Employment	Kaiser Chiefs	2	2005	
24	The Circus	Take That	1	2008	
25	Gold: Greatest Hits	ABBA	1	1992	1,995,170
26	Hot Fuss	The Killers	1	2004	
27	American Idiot	Green Day	1	2004	
28	By the Way	Red Hot Chili Peppers	1	2002	
29	Stripped	Christina Aguilera	2	2002	
30	Songs About Jane	Maroon 5	1	2002	
31	Justified	Justin Timberlake	1	2002	
32	Never Forget – The Ultimate Collection	Take That	2	2005	
33	The Greatest Hits	Texas	1	2000	
34	Call Off the Search	Katie Melua	1	2003	
35	Born to Do It	Craig David	1	2000	
36	Play	Moby	1	1999	
37	Number Ones	Michael Jackson	1	2003	
38	Missundaztood	Pink	3	2002	
39	Just Enough Education to Perform	Stereophonics	1	2001	
40	Let Go	Avril Lavigne	1	2002	
41	Final Straw	Snow Patrol	3	2003	
42	Unbreakable – The Greatest Hits Vol. 1	Westlife	1	2002	1,730,028
43	Friday's Child	Will Young	1	2003	
44	Songbird	Eva Cassidy	1	1998	
45	Demon Days	Gorillaz	1	2005	
46	Fever	Kylie Minogue	1	2001	
47	Coast to Coast	Westlife	1	2000	
48	The Platinum Collection (Greatest Hits I, II, III)	Queen	2	2000	
49	Whitney: The Greatest Hits	Whitney Houston	1	2000	
50	In Time: The Best of R.E.M. 1988–2003	R.E.M.	1	2003	
51	Eye to the Telescope	KT Tunstall	3	2004	
52	I Dreamed a Dream	Susan Boyle	1	2009	1,632,732
53	Gotta Get Thru This	Daniel Bedingfield	2	2002	
54	Music	Madonna	1	2000	
55	Intensive Care	Robbie Williams	1	2005	
56	Elephunk	The Black Eyed Peas	3	2003	
57	Good Girl Gone Bad	Rihanna	1	2007	
58	Life in Cartoon Motion	Mika	1	2007	
59	ELV1S	Elvis Presley	1	2002	
60	Breakaway	Kelly Clarkson	3	2005	
61	The Eminem Show	Eminem	1	2002	
62	Il Divo	Il Divo	1	2004	
63	Escape	Enrique Iglesias	1	2001	
64	Undiscovered	James Morrison	1	2006	
65	Razorlight	Razorlight	1	2006	
66	In Between Dreams	Jack Johnson	1	2005	
67	Greatest Hits	Guns N' Roses	1	2004	
68	Greatest Hits 1970–2002	Elton John	3	2002	
69	Ta-Dah	Scissor Sisters	1	2006	
70	Sam's Town	The Killers	1	2006	
71	Confessions	Usher	1	2004	
72	The Story So Far: The Very Best of Rod Stewart	Rod Stewart	7	2001	
73	The Fame	Lady Gaga	1	2009	1,388,847
74	Inside In/Inside Out	The Kooks	2	2006	
75	Permission to Land	The Darkness	1	2003	
76	One Love	Blue	1	2002	
77	Dreams Can Come True, Greatest Hits Vol. 1	Gabrielle	2	2001	
78	Hybrid Theory	Linkin Park	4	2000	
79	Stop the Clocks	Oasis	2	2006	
80	My Way: The Best of Frank Sinatra	Frank Sinatra	7	1997	
81	Ronan	Ronan Keating	1	2000	
82	Confessions on a Dance Floor	Madonna	1	2005	
83	Face to Face	Westlife	1	2005	
84	Whatever People Say I Am, That's What I'm Not	Arctic Monkeys	1	2006	
85	Forever Faithless – The Greatest Hits	Faithless	1	2005	
86	Piece by Piece	Katie Melua	1	2005	
87	Fallen	Evanescence	1	2003	
88	I'm Not Dead	Pink	3	2006	
89	Curtain Call: The Hits	Eminem	1	2005	
90	Viva la Vida or Death and All His Friends	Coldplay	1	2008	
91	All Rise	Blue	1	2001	
92	The Man Who	Travis	1	1999	
93	10 Years of Hits	Ronan Keating	1	2004	
94	Franz Ferdinand	Franz Ferdinand	3	2004	
95	PCD	The Pussycat Dolls	7	2005	
96	Rise	Gabrielle	1	1999	
97	How to Dismantle an Atomic Bomb	U2	1	2004	
98	The Invisible Band	Travis	1	2001	
99	Anastacia	Anastacia	1	2004	
100	A New Day at Midnight	David Gray	1	2002	

== See also ==
- List of best-selling singles of the 2000s (decade) in the United Kingdom
- List of best-selling albums of the 21st century in the United Kingdom
