= White Ladder =

Studio album by David Gray
- Released: 27 November 1998
- Recorded: April–August 1998
- Studio: Home studio (London)
- Genre: Folktronica
- Length: 52:37
- Labels: iht; ATO/RCA; East West
- Producers: David Gray; Iestyn Polson; Craig McClune

David Gray chronology
Sell, Sell, Sell (1996)	White Ladder (1998)	Lost Songs 95–98 (2000)

Singles from White Ladder
- 1. "This Year's Love" Released: 29 March 1999; 2. "Babylon" Released: 12 July 1999; 3. "Please Forgive Me" Released: 22 November 1999; 4. "Babylon (re-mix)" Released: 19 June 2000; 5. "Please Forgive Me (re-mix)" Released: 16 October 2000; 6. "This Year's Love (re-issue)" Released: 5 March 2001; 7. "Sail Away" Released: 16 July 2001; 8. "Say Hello Wave Goodbye" Released: 17 December 2001

White Ladder is the fourth studio album by English singer-songwriter David Gray. It was first released in November 1998 through Gray's own record label, IHT Records, but failed to chart. On 24 April 2000, the album was re-released by Dave Matthews' label ATO Records and debuted at number 69 on the UK Albums Chart, before climbing to number one on 5 August 2001, more than a year later. White Ladder produced five singles, including the hit "Babylon", which ignited interest in the album and shot Gray to worldwide fame. Other singles released from the album were "This Year's Love", "Please Forgive Me", "Sail Away", and "Say Hello, Wave Goodbye".

White Ladder spent almost three full years on the UK top 100, consistently charting between May 2000 and March 2003. Its total charting time as of 2020 was 176 weeks, making it one of the longest-charting albums in UK chart history. It was massively successful in Ireland, where it spent six consecutive weeks at number one on the Irish Albums Chart and had sold 350,000 copies by 2002. In 2015, it was still the biggest-selling album of all time in Ireland. White Ladder was the fifth-best-selling album of the 2000s in the UK, with 2.9 million copies sold. The album has sold over 3 million copies in the UK, making it the country's eleventh-best-selling album of the 21st century as well as the 28th-best-selling album of all time. The record has sold over seven million copies worldwide.

== Background ==
White Ladder was self-financed and recorded in Gray's London flat. To support the album, Gray toured the United States with the Dave Matthews Band, with Matthews releasing White Ladder in the United States on his label, ATO, in 2000, as the label's first release. Following the album's success, Gray toured the US and UK extensively between 2000–2001 to promote the record.

A hidden track, "Through to Myself", can be found in the pregap of the original 1999 UK IHT Records release (by rewinding from the start of "Please Forgive Me"). The US CD release does not include the secret track but instead includes the audio bonus track "Babylon II" as well as an enhanced section that includes a mini-documentary with a live performance of "Babylon", a brief biography, and web links. The Japanese release includes the bonus track "Over My Head", which also appears as a B-side on the 1999 "Babylon" single.

The cover of "Say Hello, Wave Goodbye", originally recorded by Soft Cell, features additional lines from the Van Morrison songs "Madame George" and "Into the Mystic".

== Commercial reception ==
Professional ratings
Review scores
Source	Rating
AllMusic	4.5/5 stars
Entertainment Weekly	B
The Guardian	4/5 stars
Hot Press	11/12
NME	6/10
Pitchfork	7.9/10
Q	3/5 stars
Rolling Stone	3/5 stars
The Rolling Stone Album Guide	4/5 stars
Uncut	4/5 stars

White Ladder was originally released on Gray's own label, IHT Records. It spent six weeks at number one in Ireland, selling 100,000 copies in that time. By September 2001, the album had been certified 20× Platinum by the Irish Recorded Music Association (IRMA) for sales of over 300,000 units; it remains the biggest-selling album in that country.

It was only after its re-release in April 2000 on ATO that the album managed to chart in the UK, debuting at number 69 on the UK Albums Chart. On 5 August 2001, sixteen months after the re-release and almost three years after its original publication, it reached number one. White Ladder has spent a total of 175 weeks on the UK Albums Chart. Aside from "Please Forgive Me", which charted at number 72 on the UK Singles Chart, all other single releases charted within the top 20: the re-issued "Please Forgive Me" charted at number 18, and "Say Hello Wave Goodbye" and "Sail Away" peaked at number 26. White Ladder was the UK's fifth best-selling UK album of the 2000s. It had sold 2,940,575 units in the UK by 24 July 2011 and reached the three-million mark by March 2015. As of October 2019, it is the 11th best-selling UK album of the 21st century.

In the United States, the album peaked at number 35 on the Billboard 200, spending a whole year on the chart. It earned Gray a nomination in the United States at the 44th Grammy Awards for Best New Artist.

Reflecting on White Ladder's success in 2010, Gray stated: "I still pinch myself when I think about it. That record will be there for ever. It just connected in such a big way with people. [...] It was the period that came after that was difficult. [...] I'm sort of seen as a pop artist. I'm dismissed as slight, I'd say, because of White Ladder."

In Ireland, White Ladder entered the Irish chart at number 25. 61 weeks later, and for the first time, the album went to number one on 24 January 2000, spending six weeks in that position and subsequently spending much of the next four years in and around the top ten. It remains the best-selling album in the Republic of Ireland. At one stage, it was said that one in every four Irish households had a copy.

== Legacy ==
Gray believes that the success of White Ladder paved the way for "soul-baring" artists such as James Blunt, Ed Sheeran, George Ezra, James Bay, and Tom Walker. In an interview with the Daily Star, he said: "When I started out, a man with a guitar baring his soul wasn't in vogue at all. Suddenly, it's everywhere! [The album's] success came from nowhere, and it changed how the business thought about what music should be. Since then, there have been lots of artists who've taken it on and done their own thing."

== Track listing ==
All tracks written by David Gray, unless otherwise noted.

No.	Title	Writer(s)	Length
1.	"Please Forgive Me"		5:35
2.	"Babylon"		4:25
3.	"My Oh My"	Gray, McClune	4:37
4.	"We're Not Right"	Gray, McClune, Polson	3:03
5.	"Nightblindness"		4:23
6.	"Silver Lining"		6:00
7.	"White Ladder"	Gray, McClune, Polson	4:14
8.	"This Year's Love"		4:05
9.	"Sail Away"		5:15
10.	"Say Hello Wave Goodbye"	Almond, Ball, Morrison	9:03

UK hidden pregap track
No.	Title	Length
0.	"Through to Myself"	1:56

US-only bonus track
No.	Title	Length
11.	"Babylon II"	3:38

Japanese version
No.	Title	Writer(s)	Length
1.	"Please Forgive Me"		5:35
2.	"Babylon"		4:25
3.	"My Oh My"	Gray, McClune	4:37
4.	"We're Not Right"	Gray, McClune, Polson	3:03
5.	"Nightblindness"		4:23
6.	"Over My Head" (bonus track)		4:23
7.	"Silver Lining"		6:00
8.	"White Ladder"	Gray, McClune, Polson	4:14
9.	"This Year's Love"		4:05
10.	"Sail Away"		5:15
11.	"Say Hello Wave Goodbye"	Almond, Ball	9:03

20th Anniversary Edition (Disc 2)
No.	Title	Length
1.	"Lights of London"	4:44
2.	"Over My Head"	4:22
3.	"Monday Morning"	3:28
4.	"Tired of Me"	3:36
5.	"Roots of Love"	4:30
6.	"Walking in Circles"	3:49
7.	"Through to Myself"	1:57
8.	"Over My Head (Demo)"	2:40
9.	"What on Earth (Demo)"	5:04
10.	"Silver Lining (Demo)"	6:13
11.	"This Year's Love (Demo)"	3:58
12.	"Please Forgive Me (Demo)"	5:01

== Personnel ==
- David Gray – vocals, guitar (1–7 & 9–11), piano (1–3, 6, 8, 9, 11), keyboards (1, 4, 5, 7, 9)

Additional musicians

- Craig McClune – drums (1–7 & 9–11), vocals (1–7 & 9–11), keyboards (1, 4, 5, 7, 9), bass (2, 5, 8, 9, 11)
- Tim Bradshaw – keyboards on tracks 2, 3, 6, 8, and 10
- Simon Edwards – bass on tracks 3, 6, and 10
- Colm Mac Con Iomaire – violin on track 6
- Terry Edwards – string arrangements on track 11

Technical personnel

- Iestyn Polson – producer, engineer, programmer
- Marius de Vries – additional production and programming on "Sail Away"
- Steve Sidelnyk – additional programming on "Sail Away"
- Dave Turner – mastering
- Donal Dineen – photography
- Phil Knott – photography

== Charts ==
=== Weekly charts ===
Weekly chart performance for White Ladder
Chart (2000–2001)	Peak position
Australian Albums (ARIA)	34
Dutch Albums (Album Top 100)	51
French Albums (SNEP)	59
German Albums (Offizielle Top 100)	61
Irish Albums (IRMA)	1
New Zealand Albums (RMNZ)	4
Norwegian Albums (VG-lista)	18
Scottish Albums (Official Charts)	1
Swiss Albums (Schweizer Hitparade)	45
UK Albums (Official Charts)	1
US Billboard 200	35
US Top Catalog Albums (Billboard)	12
Chart (2020)	Peak position
Irish Albums (Official Charts)	8
UK Independent Albums (Official Charts)	2
UK Vinyl Albums	2
Chart (2025)	Peak position
UK Album Downloads (Official Charts)	27

=== Year-end charts ===
Year-end chart performance for White Ladder
Chart (2000)	Position
European Albums (Music & Media)	41
UK Albums (OCC)	11
Chart (2001)	Position
Canadian Albums (Nielsen SoundScan)	100
Irish Albums (IRMA)	7
UK Albums (OCC)	3
US Billboard 200	67
Chart (2002)	Position
Canadian Alternative Albums (Nielsen SoundScan)	70
UK Albums (OCC)	33
Chart (2003)	Position
UK Albums (OCC)	142
Chart (2004)	Position
UK Albums (OCC)	189
Chart (2005)	Position
UK Albums (OCC)	186

=== Decade-end charts ===
Decade-end chart performance for White Ladder
Chart (2000–2009)	Position
UK Albums (OCC)	5

== Certifications ==
Region	Certification	Certified units/sales
Australia (ARIA)	2× Platinum	140,000^{^}
Austria (IFPI Austria)	Gold	25,000^{*}
Belgium (BRMA)	Gold	25,000^{*}
Canada (Music Canada)	Platinum	100,000^{^}
France (SNEP)	Gold	100,000^{*}
Ireland (IRMA)	20× Platinum	350,000
Netherlands (NVPI)	Gold	50,000^{^}
New Zealand (RMNZ)	5× Platinum	75,000^{^}
United Kingdom (BPI)	10× Platinum	3,017,085
United States (RIAA)	Platinum	2,400,000
Summaries
Europe (IFPI)	3× Platinum	3,000,000^{*}
^{*} Sales figures based on certification alone.^{^} Shipments figures based on certification alone.

== See also ==
- List of albums which have spent the most weeks on the UK Albums Chart
- List of best-selling albums in the United Kingdom

== Release history ==
Country	Date	Label	Format	Category no.
United Kingdom	8 March 1999	IHT Records	CD	IHT CD001
United Kingdom	24 April 2000	IHT/EastWest	CD (re-issue)	8573-82983-2
United Kingdom	14 February 2020	IHT	20th Anniversary Edition	IHTCD 1912
United States	21 March 2000	RCA/ATO	CD (11 tracks/enhanced)	07863 69351-2
Japan	11 October 2000	EastWest/WEA	CD (11 tracks)	AMCE-7198
