= IHT Records =

British record label owned by David Gray

IHT Records (stylised as iht Records) is a British record label, founded and owned by David Gray. His 1999 album White Ladder was released on the label.
