= List of Questlove Supreme episodes =

Questlove Supreme is an American podcast featuring interviews with musicians, songwriters, producers, actors, directors, and industry executives.

This list captures episodes when the podcast, led by Questlove, was co-hosted by "Team Supreme" co-hosts 2016-2025. Team Supreme co-hosts included regulars Unpaid Bill (Bill Sherman), Suga Steve (Steven Mandel), and Laiya St. Clair, Phonte (Phonte Coleman) and formerly Boss Bill (Bill Johnson). The first episode was released September 7, 2016. From 2016-2019, Questlove Supreme was hosted on Pandora. In 2019 Questlove Supreme moved to iHeartMedia. The final episode with Team Supreme aired on April 30, 2025.

== Series overview ==
Season	Episodes	Originally released	
Season	Episodes	First released	Last released
1	28	September 7, 2016	April 5, 2017
2	39	April 26, 2017	January 17, 2018
3	50	December 4, 2019	November 18, 2020
4	50	November 25, 2020	October 27, 2021
5	50	January 5, 2022	December 28, 2022
6	50	January 25, 2023	January 10, 2024
7	51	January 31, 2024	April 30, 2025

== Episodes ==
=== Season One ===
Episode Number	Air Date	Guest(s)
1	September 7, 2016	Maya Rudolph
2	September 14, 2016	Bob Power
3	September 21, 2016	Dante Ross
4	September 28, 2016	The Revolution
5	October 5, 2016	Alan Leeds
6	October 12, 2016	Shep Gordon
7	October 19, 2016	DJ Moma, X Ambassadors, Chill Moody, Tish Hyman, SMSHNG HRTS, DJ Stretch Armstrong, Bobbito, and Lady Leshurr
8	October 26, 2016	Jungle Brothers, Yuna, Daniel Marley, Freeway, Grits & Biscuits, Emily Wells
9	November 2, 2016	Kimbra
10	November 9, 2016	Mike Birbiglia
11	November 16, 2016	Ray Parker Jr.
12	November 30, 2016	Solange
13	December 7, 2016	Stephen Hill
14	December 14, 2016	Pete Rock
15	December 21, 2016	No guest / Holiday special
16	December 28, 2016	No guest / New Years special
17	January 11, 2017	Marley Marl
18	January 18, 2017	Faith Newman
19	January 25, 2017	Q-Tip
20	February 1, 2017	Kevin Liles
21	February 8, 2017	Chris Rock
22	February 15, 2017	MC Serch
23	February 22, 2017	Dan Charnas
24	March 1, 2017	Usher
25	March 8, 2017	Tom Silverman
26	March 22, 2017	DJ Premier
27	March 29, 2017	Prodigy
28	April 5, 2017	Just Blaze

=== Season Two ===
Episode Number	Air Date	Guest(s)
1	April 26, 2017	Babyface, Pt. 1
2	May 3, 2017	Babyface, Pt. 2
3	May 10, 2017	The Emotions
4	May 17, 2017	Nelly Furtado
5	May 24, 2017	Jerrod Carmichael
6	May 31, 2017	Siedah Garrett
7	June 7, 2017	Jimmy Jam, Pt. 1
8	June 14, 2017	Jimmy Jam, Pt. 2
9	June 21, 2017	Jimmy Jam, Pt. 3
10	June 28, 2017	Gilles Peterson
11	July 5, 2017	Roy Ayers
12	July 12, 2017	Angela Rye
13	July 19, 2017	Charlie Wilson
14	July 26, 2017	Heather Hunter
15	August 2, 2017	Donnie Simpson
16	August 9, 2017	Kathryn Bigelow
17	August 16, 2017	Biz Markie
18	August 23, 2017	Prince Paul
19	August 30, 2017	Spike Lee, Pt. 1
20	September 6, 2017	Spike Lee, Pt. 2
21	September 13, 2017	Too Short
22	September 20, 2017	Deon Cole
23	September 27, 2017	Chaka Khan
24	October 4, 2017	Herb Alpert
25	October 11, 2017	Mtume, Pt. 1
26	October 18. 2017	Mtume, Pt. 2
27	October 25, 2017	Michael McDonald
28	November 1, 2017	Michael Brauer
29	November 8, 2017	Bootsy Collins, Pt. 1
30	November 15, 2017	Bootsy Collins, Pt. 2
31	November 22, 2017	Darius Rucker
32	November 29, 2017	Robin Thede
33	December 6, 2017	D-Nice
34	December 13, 2017	Sheila E.
35	December 20, 2017	Gina Rodriguez
36	December 27, 2017	2017 Year in Review with Roy Wood Jr.
37	January 3, 2018	Jason Flom
38	January 10, 2018	Steve Miller
39	January 17, 2018	Ty Dolla $ign

=== Season Three ===
Episode Number	Air Date	Guest(s)
1	December 3, 2019	Jimmy Fallon
2	December 10, 2019	Kurtis Blow
3	December 17, 2019	Kim Fields
4	December 24, 2019	QLS Decade in Review featuring Wyatt Cenac
5	December 31, 2019	Seth Rogen
6	January 8, 2020	Esperanza Spalding
7	January 14, 2020	Sophia Chang
8	January 21, 2020	Cecily Strong
9	January 29, 2020	Tito Jackson
10	February 4, 2020	Rapsody
11	February 11, 2020	Huey Lewis
12	February 18, 2020	Estelle
13	February 25, 2020	James Taylor
14	March 3, 2020	Zoë Kravitz
15	March 10, 2020	Johnny Gill
16	March 18, 2020	Alan Leeds, Pt. 2
17	March 25, 2020	Alan Leeds Pt. 3
18	March 31, 2020	Dawnn Lewis
19	April 7, 2020	The Family Stand, Pt. 1
20	April 14, 2020	The Family Stand, Pt. 2
21	April 28, 2020	John Legend, Pt. 1
22	May 6, 2020	Little Brother
23	May 13, 2020	Ilana Glazer
24	May 20, 2020	Fat Joe
25	May 27, 2020	Norah Jones
26	June 3, 2020	Kenny Gamble
27	June 9, 2020	Jill Scott, Pt. 1
28	June 17, 2020	Jill Scott, Pt. 2
29	June 24, 2020	Ceelo Green, Pt. 1
30	June 31, 2020	Ceelo Green, Pt. 2
31	July 8, 2020	Rick Rubin, Pt. 1
32	July 15, 2020	Spike Lee
33	July 22, 2020	Todd Rundgren
34	June 29, 2020	Musiq Soulchild
35	August 5, 2020	Big Lez (Leslie Segar)
36	August 12, 2020	Larry Gold
37	August 18, 2020	Sunny Hostin
38	August 26, 2020	George Clinton, Pt. 1
39	September 2, 2020	George Clinton, Pt. 2
40	September 9, 2020	Robert Glasper
41	September 16, 2020	Jemele Hill, Pt. 1
42	September 23, 2020	Jemele Hill, Pt. 2
43	September 29, 2020	Alicia Keys
44	October 6, 2020	Bruce Hornsby, Pt. 1
45	October 14, 2020	Jurnee Smollett, Jake Smollett, Jussie Smollett, and Jazz Smollett (The Smolletts)
46	October 20, 2020	Brian Alexander Morgan
47	October 28, 2020	Lin-Manuel Miranda
48	November 3, 2020	Joy Reid
49	November 10, 2020	Shawn Gee
50	November 17, 2020	Boyz II Men, Pt. 1

=== Season Four ===
Episode Number	Air Date	Guest(s)
1	November 25, 2020	Boyz II Men, Pt. 2
2	December 2, 2020	Tarriona "Tank" Ball of Tank and the Bangas
3	December 9, 2020	Tommy Oliver & Mike Africa Jr.
4	December 16, 2020	Glynn Turman
5	December 18, 2020	Branford Marsalis
6	December 23, 2020	Deon Cole
7	December 29, 2020	Jason Sudeikis
8	January 13, 2021	Mariah Carey, Pt. 1
9	January 15, 2021	Mariah Carey, Pt. 2
10	January 20, 2021	Special: Happy 50th Birthday Questlove!
11	January 27, 2021	John Densmore (The Doors)
12	February 3, 2021	Melba Moore
13	February 10, 2021	Pharoahe Monch
14	February 16, 2021	Stephanie Mills
15	February 24, 2021	Reverend Al Sharpton
16	March 3, 2021	Anika Noni Rose
17	March 9, 2021	Lisa Robinson, Pt. 3
18	March 17, 2021	Tiffany Cross
19	March 24, 2021	Macy Gray
20	March 31, 2021	Monie Love
21	April 7, 2021	Eric Andre
22	April 14, 2021	Terence Blanchard
23	April 21, 2021	Anthony Mackie
24	April 28, 2021	Sam Pollard
25	May 5, 2021	Bowlegged Lou, Pt. 1
26	May 12, 2021	Bowlegged Lou, Pt. 2
27	May 18, 2021	The Avalanches
28	May 25, 2021	Tracee Ellis Ross
29	June 1, 2021	The Jacksons (Tito, Jackie, and Marlon Jackson)
30	June 8, 2021	El DeBarge
31	June 15, 2021	Nathan East, Pt. 1
32	June 22, 2021	Morris Day
33	June 29, 2021	Marilyn McCoo & Billy Davis Jr.
34	July 6, 2021	Gina Yashere
35	July 13, 2021	Mark Ronson
36	July 21, 2021	Sleater-Kinney
37	July 27, 2021	Howard Hewett
38	August 4, 2021	Bob Ellis, Pt. 1
39	August 10, 2021	Shirley Jones, Pt. 2
40	August 18, 2021	Lady B
41	August 24, 2021	Dr. Mathew Knowles
42	September 1, 2021	Classic: Deon Cole
43	September 8, 2021	Pat Metheny
44	September 15, 2021	Special: 5 Year Anniversary
45	September 21, 2021	Robert "Kool" Bell (Kool and the Gang)
46	September 29, 2021	Raphael Saadiq, Pt. 1
47	October 5, 2021	Raphael Saadiq, Pt. 2
48	October 12, 2021	Bernadette Cooper
50	October 26, 2021	Carlos Santana

=== Season Five ===
Episode Number	Air Date	Guest(s)
1	January 5, 2022	Doug E. Fresh, Pt. 1
2	January 12, 2022	Doug E. Fresh, Pt. 2
3	January 18, 2022	2021 Rap Up with Mad Skillz, Pt. 1
4	January 25, 2022	2021 Rap Up with Mad Skillz, Pt. 2
5	February 1, 2022	Will Smith
6	February 8, 2022	Mic Murphy
7	February 15, 2022	Fred Hammond, Pt. 1
8	February 22, 2022	Fred Hammond, Pt. 2
9	March 1, 2022	Deniece Williams
10	March 8, 2022	Bonnie Raitt
11	March 15, 2022	Monica Lynch, Pt. 1
12	March 22, 2022	Monica Lynch, Pt. 2
13	March 30, 2022	John Oates
14	April 6, 2022	Daryl Hall
15	April 13, 2022	Teedra Moses
16	April 20, 2022	Elvis Costello, Pt. 1
17	April 27, 2022	Elvis Costello, Pt. 2
18	May 3, 2022	Eric Roberson, Pt. 1
19	May 10, 2022	Eric Roberson, Pt. 2
20	May 17, 2022	Joan Jett
21	May 25, 2022	Steve Ferrone, Pt. 1
22	May 31, 2022	Steve Ferrone, Pt. 2
23	June 8, 2022	Wayne Shorter
24	June 15, 2022	Rick Astley
25	June 21, 2022	Robin Thede - Live At The 2022 Roots Picnic
26	June 29, 2022	Terri Lyne Carrington
27	July 5, 2022	Tevin Campbell
28	July 12, 2022	Larry Blackmon of Cameo
29	July 19, 2022	Ne-Yo
30	July 27, 2022	Danyel Smith
31	August 3, 2022	L.A. Reid, Pt. 1
32	August 10, 2022	L.A. Reid, Pt. 2
33	August 17, 2022	L.A. Reid, Pt. 3
34	August 23, 2022	Jenifer Lewis, Pt. 1
35	August 30, 2022	Jenifer Lewis, Pt. 2
36	September 20, 2022	Steve Rifkind, Pt. 1
37	September 28, 2022	Steve Rifkind, Pt. 2
38	October 4, 2022	Ramon Hervey II
39	October 11, 2022	DJ Clark Kent
40	October 18, 2022	Stacey Abrams
41	October 25, 2022	Millie Jackson & Keisha Jackson, Pt. 1
42	November 2, 2022	Millie Jackson & Keisha Jackson, Pt. 2
43	November 9, 2022	Bruce Springsteen
44	November 15, 2022	DJ Drama, Pt. 1
45	November 22, 2022	DJ Drama, Pt. 2
46	November 29, 2022	Adam Blackstone
47	December 6, 2022	Organized Noize, Pt. 1
48	December 13, 2022	Organized Noize, Pt. 2
49	December 21, 2022	Diamond D
50	December 28, 2022	2022 Year End Review with Lil Rel Howery

=== Season Six ===
Episode Number	Air Date	Guest(s)
1	January 25, 2023	Deborah Harry and Chris Stein of Blondie
2	February 1, 2023	Shaggy
3	February 8, 2023	Dallas Austin, Pt. 1
4	February 15, 2023	Dallas Austin, Pt. 2
5	February 22, 2023	Malcolm-Jamal Warner
6	March 1, 2023	Cathy Hughes, Pt. 1
7	March 7, 2023	Cathy Hughes, Pt. 2
8	March 14, 2023	Speech (rapper)
9	March 21, 2023	Taboo
10	March 29, 2023	Ice-T, Pt. 1
11	April 4, 2023	Ice-T, Pt. 2
12	April 12, 2023	Bob James
13	April 18, 2023	Chanté Moore
14	April 26, 2023	Jean Carne
15	May 3, 2023	Charlamagne tha God, Pt. 1
16	May 10, 2023	Charlamagne tha God, Pt. 2
17	May 17, 2023	Sam Jay
18	May 24, 2023	Lisa Cortés, Pt. 1
19	May 31, 2023	Lisa Cortés, Pt. 2
20	June 7, 2023	The QLS Pilot: From The Vaults
21	June 14, 2023	QLS Live From The 2023 Roots Picnic
22	June 21, 2023	David Porter
23	June 27, 2023	President Bill Clinton
24	July 5, 2023	Angie Martinez
25	July 12, 2023	Leroy Burgess, Pt. 1
26	July 18, 2023	Leroy Burgess, Pt. 2
27	July 26, 2023	Dave Matthews
28	August 2, 2023	Slum Village, Pt. 1
29	August 8, 2023	Slum Village, Pt. 2
30	August 15, 2023	Styles P
31	August 22, 2023	Kid Capri, Pt. 1
32	August 29, 2023	Kid Capri, Pt. 2
33	September 6, 2023	Chris Robinson, Pt. 1
34	September 12, 2023	Chris Robinson, Pt. 2
35	September 20, 2023	Cedric the Entertainer
36	September 27, 2023	George Brown of Kool & the Gang, Pt. 1
37	October 3, 2023	George Brown of Kool & the Gang, Pt. 2
38	October 18, 2023	Sly Stone tribute with Ben Greenman
39	October 25, 2023	Salli Richardson-Whitfield
40	November 1, 2023	Hannibal Buress, Pt. 1
41	November 8, 2023	Hannibal Buress, Pt. 2
42	November 15, 2023	Fab Morvan of Milli Vanilli
43	November 22, 2023	LL Cool J, Pt. 1
44	November 29, 2023	LL Cool J, Pt. 2
45	December 6, 2023	Shanice Wilson & Tracie Spencer
46	December 12, 2023	André 3000
47	December 19, 2023	Tariq "Black Thought" Trotter
48	December 27, 2023	Team Supreme
49	January 2, 2024	Paradise Gray, Pt. 1
50	January 9, 2024	Paradise Gray, Pt. 2

=== Season Seven ===
Episode Number	Air Date	Guest(s)
1	January 31, 2024	Pino Palladino
2	February 7, 2024	Robert Townsend, Pt. 1
3	February 14, 2024	Robert Townsend, Pt. 2
4	February 21, 2024	Ed Eckstine
5	February 28, 2024	QLS Gives Frankie Beverly His Flowers
6	March 6, 2024	Brittany Howard
7	March 13, 2024	Corinne Bailey Rae
8	March 20, 2024	Ledisi
9	March 27, 2024	Fatima Robinson
10	April 3, 2024	Narada Michael Walden, Pt. 1
11	April 10, 2024	Narada Michael Walden, Pt. 2
12	April 17, 2024	Da Beatminerz
13	April 24, 2024	Erika Alexander, Pt. 1
14	April 27, 2024	Erika Alexander, Pt. 2
15	May 1, 2024	SiR
16	May 8, 2024	Adam Levine, Pt. 1
17	May 15, 2024	Adam Levine, Pt. 2
18	May 22, 2024	Weezer
19	May 29, 2024	WILLOW
20	June 5, 2024	Black Music Month: Wayne Brady, Pt. 1
21	June 12, 2024	Black Music Month: Wayne Brady, Pt. 2
22	June 19, 2024	Black Music Month: James Poyser, Pt. 1
23	June 26, 2024	Black Music Month: James Poyser, Pt. 2
24	July 3, 2024	George Benson
25	July 10, 2024	BeBe Winans
26	July 17, 2024	George Faison
27	July 24, 2024	Sananda Maitreya, Pt. 1
28	July 31, 2024	Sananda Maitreya, Pt. 2
29	August 7, 2024	David Murray (saxophonist)
30	August 14, 2024	The Foreign Exchange
31	August 21, 2024	Common & Pete Rock
32	August 28, 2024	Johnny Marr
33	September 3, 2024	Billy Porter, Pt. 1
34	September 11, 2024	Billy Porter, Pt. 2
35	September 18, 2024	Eve with Kathy Iandoli
36	September 25, 2024	Nick Lowe
37	October 2, 2024	Sam Hollander
38	October 9, 2024	Amerie
39	October 16, 2024	Jonathan Shecter, Pt. 1
39	October 22, 2024	Jonathan Shecter, Pt. 2
39	October 29, 2024	Cindy Blackman Santana
40	November 6, 2024	Kathleen Hanna
41	November 12, 2024	RZA, Pt. 1
42	November 19, 2024	Ben Vereen
43	November 27, 2024	RZA, Pt. 2
44	December 3, 2024	Boney James
45	December 10, 2024	Bilal
46	December 17, 2024	Adam "Ad-Rock" Horovitz
47	December 24, 2024	James "J.T." Taylor
48	January 1, 2025	Erick Sermon, Pt. 1
49	January 7, 2025	Erick Sermon, Pt. 2
50	April 23, 2025	The Questlove Supreme Reunion Finale Part 1
51	April 30, 2025	The Questlove Supreme Reunion Finale Part 2
