= Tibet House US =

Tibetan culture nonprofit in New York City

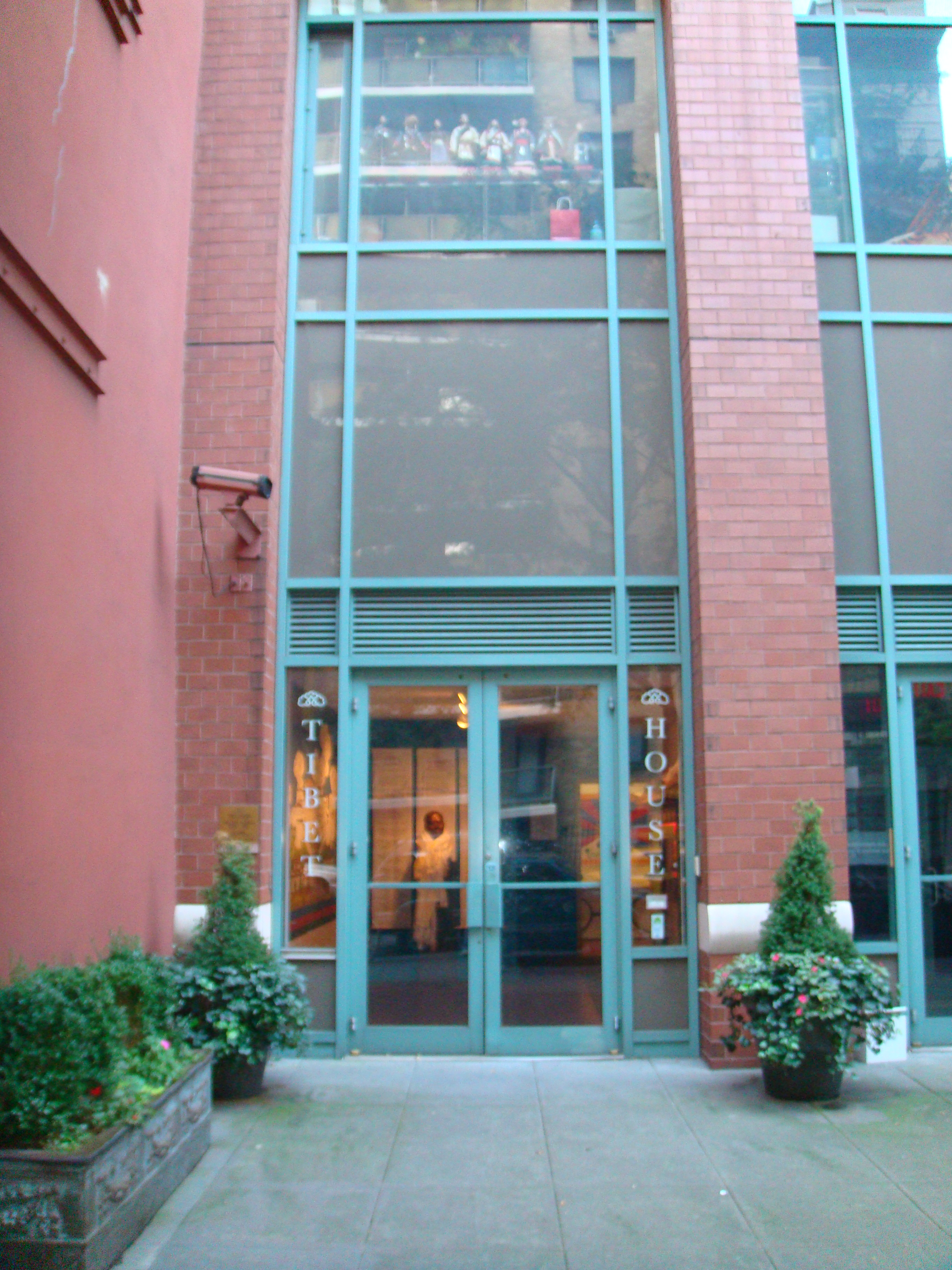
- Tibet House US

- Location within New York City
- Established: 1987
- Location: 22 West 15th Street, Manhattan, New York, US
- Coordinates: 40°44′14″N 73°59′40″W
- President: Robert A. F. Thurman
- Website: thus.org

Tibet House US (THUS) is a Tibetan cultural preservation and education 501(c)(3) nonprofit based in Manhattan, New York City. It was founded in 1987 after the Fourteenth Dalai Lama, Tenzin Gyatso expressed the wish to establish a cultural institution to build awareness of Tibetan culture.

Part of the international network of Tibet Houses, the organization promotes and preserves Tibetan culture through exhibitions, educational programming, publications, contemplative practice, and public cultural events. It is also known for maintaining collections of Tibetan art and archives, and for its annual benefit concert at Carnegie Hall.

== History ==
In 1959, soon after escaping the Chinese invasion of Tibet to India, the 14th Dalai Lama told fellow refugees, "The great job ahead of us now is to preserve our religion and culture." In 1987, Tibet House US was founded in New York City by a group of supporters of Tibetan culture and the Tibetan cause, including Robert Thurman, Richard Gere, and Philip Glass. Its founding mission was to preserve, protect, and present the cultural and religious heritage of Tibet and to communicate the contemporary relevance of that heritage.

Frances Thargay, while serving at the Office of Tibet in New York as executive assistant to Tenzin Tethong, drafted the first proposal for Richard Gere's Tibet House initiative. Managing director Nena Thurman later helped launch the annual benefit concert with Glass, as well as the annual benefit auction, and also became executive chairwoman of Menla Retreat.

== Programs and activities ==
Tibet House US presents educational, cultural, and public programs centered on Tibetan civilization and its artistic, philosophical, and contemplative traditions. These include lectures, exhibitions, meditation programs, public conversations, and other events exploring Tibetan Buddhism, sacred art, ethics, mind science, and contemporary cultural dialogue.

=== Teachings, conferences, and public events ===
THUS has collaborated with many educational and cultural institutions and has sponsored teachings in New York City by the Dalai Lama.

The organization was involved in the Newark Peace Education Summit, a three-day 2011 conference on nonviolence and peacebuilding that included the Dalai Lama, Jody Williams, Shirin Ebadi, Cory Booker, Martin Luther King III, Jeffrey Sachs, Deepak Chopra, Rabbi Michael Lerner, and anthropologist Wade Davis, among others.

The Global Vision Summit, launched in 2020, brought together spiritual leaders, scholars, and students of the Dalai Lama, including Richard Gere, Thupten Jinpa, Richard Davidson, and Daniel Goleman, and drew more than 90,000 participants worldwide. The 2021 summit, The Power of Compassion, featured Daniel Goleman, Marina Abramović, Jan Willis, Mark Hyman, and Tara Brach. Participants in the 2023 summit included Daniel Goleman, Thupten Jinpa, Jan Willis, Vandana Shiva, Philippe Goldin, Tenzin Geyche Tethong, Rev. Matthew Fox, Tenzin Priyadarshi, and Venerable Thubten Chodron.

=== Exhibitions and awards ===
The organization has mounted and supported exhibitions of Tibetan art and culture and has also presented The Art of Freedom Award, honoring contributions aligned with its mission. Recipients have included author Eliot Pattison, director Martin Scorsese, and artist Roy Lichtenstein.

In 2021, THUS presented Transforming Minds: Kyabje Gelek Rimpoche and Friends, in partnership with the Allen Ginsberg Estate and Jewel Heart International.

In 2022–2023, Tibet House US presented Saraswati's Gift: The Art and Life of a Modern Buddhist Revolutionary, a retrospective of the work of artist Mayumi Oda.

In 2025, the organization presented TABO: Into the Light, a photographic exhibition by Peter van Ham focused on Tabo Monastery.

=== Fundraising ===
Fundraising events include the Tibet House Benefit Auction to Preserve Tibetan Culture and a benefit dinner at Christie's, begun in 2002.

The organization's best-known public fundraiser is the annual Tibet House US Benefit Concert at Carnegie Hall, organized by Philip Glass. First held in 1989, the concert is associated with the celebration of Losar, the Tibetan New Year, and has been described as one of New York City's longest-running cultural benefit events.

On March 3, 2026, Tibet House US held its 39th Annual Benefit Concert at Carnegie Hall, featuring Laurie Anderson, Tenzin Choegyal, Elvis Costello, Robert De Niro, Elysian Fields, Maya Hawke, Christian Lee Hutson, Jesse Malin, the Philip Glass Ensemble, Kate Pierson, Allison Russell, and Toro y Moi, along with performances by the Resistance Revival Chorus and the Scorchio Quartet and an invocation by monks from Drepung Gomang Monastery.

Past musicians and performers have included Patti Smith, David Bowie, Allen Ginsberg, Laurie Anderson, Lou Reed, Iggy Pop, Björk, Debbie Harry, Taj Mahal, Paul Simon, Ray Davies, Richie Havens, John Cale, Emmylou Harris, Billy Corgan, Sufjan Stevens, Nawang Khechog, Trey Anastasio, Shawn Colvin, Jimmy Dale Gilmore, David Byrne, Gogol Bordello, Ziggy Marley, FKA Twigs, Annie Lennox, Eddie Vedder, Phoebe Bridgers, Tenzin Choegyal, Bettye LaVette, Dadon, The Flaming Lips, Michael Stipe, Sheryl Crow, Moby, Sigur Rós, Ashley McIsaac, Bright Eyes, Lenny Kaye, Natalie Merchant, Angélique Kidjo, Foday Musa Suso, Caetano Veloso, the Drepung Loseling Monks, Regina Spektor, Pierce Turner, The Scorchio String Quartet, Tenzin Kunsel, Bajah + the Dry Eye Crew, Stephen Colbert, New Order, Allison Russell, Arooj Aftab, Brittany Howard, and others.

In 2021, opening the livestreamed 34th annual benefit concert, the Dalai Lama sent a video message thanking Tibet House US and its founders.

After Keanu Reeves appeared in the virtual 35th annual benefit concert in 2022 reciting the Beat poem "Pull My Daisy", his participation drew backlash from Chinese nationalists and prompted reports that his films had been removed from streaming platforms in China.

== Collections ==
Tibet House US collects and displays Tibetan sacred, fine, and folk arts with the long-term hope of repatriating them to a future national museum in Tibet. Since the Chinese occupation of Tibet beginning in 1949, many artworks and Buddhist manuscripts were destroyed, especially during the Cultural Revolution.

The Repatriation Collection and the Old Tibet Photographic Archive were founded in 1992. The photographic archive began with the gift of missionary Marion Grant Griebenow's more than 3,000 images and journal writings from Tibet dating from 1928 to 1949, and later expanded to include the work of photographers such as Hugh Richardson, Heinrich Harrer, Fosco Maraini, David McDonald, Lt. J. R. Weir, the Tokan Tada collection from the Toyo Bunko Library in Tokyo, and the A.T. Steele Collection.

The Repatriation Collection consists of more than 1,500 thangkas, bronzes, ritual objects, and works of folk art. These archives and collections document the destruction and dispersal of Tibetan religious and cultural heritage, including the loss of monasteries, temples, libraries, and artistic traditions.

== Selected publications ==
- Worlds of Transformation: Tibetan Art of Wisdom and Compassion, Marylin Rhie and Robert Thurman, essay by David Jackson, co-published with the Rubin Museum, Harry N. Abrams Co., 1991, ISBN 9780810963870
- Mandala: The Architecture of Enlightenment, Denise P. Leidy, Robert Thurman, first edition published with Asia Society and Shambhala Publications, thereafter Overlook Press, 1997, ISBN 978-0500280188
- Wisdom and Compassion: The Sacred Art of Tibet, Marylin Rhie and Robert Thurman, co-published with Harry N. Abrams Co., 1991–1998 in English, German, Spanish, Catalan, Japanese, and Chinese; 2000, ISBN 0810939851
- The Tibetan Wheel of Existence, Jacqueline Dunnington, 2000, ISBN 978-0967011530
- Visions of Tibet: Outer, Inner, Secret, photographs by Brian Kistler, introduction by Robert Thurman, ed. Thomas Yarnell, Overlook Duckworth, 2005, ISBN 978-1585677412
- Vanishing Tibet, Catherine Steinmann and Danny Conant, 2008, ISBN 978-1590200957
- A Shrine For Tibet: The Alice S. Kandell Collection, Marylin Rhie and Robert Thurman, Overlook Press, 2010, ISBN 978-1590203101
- Man of Peace: The Illustrated Life Story of the Dalai Lama of Tibet, graphic novel, William Meyers, Robert Thurman, Michael G. Burbank, initiated artistically by Rabkar Wangchuk, art coordinated by Steve Buccellato and Michael Burbank, ISBN 978-1941312032

=== Translations and scholarly works ===
- The Treasury of Buddhist Sciences, series, editors Robert Thurman, Thomas Yarnall; and The Treasury of Indic Sciences, series, editors Robert Thurman, Gary Tubb, and Thomas Yarnall, co-published with the American Institute of Buddhist Studies and the Columbia University Center for Buddhist Studies; Columbia University Press
- Universal Vehicle Discourse Literature, Lozang Jamspal, et al., 2004, ISBN 978-0-9753734-0-8
- Kalacakra Tantra: Chapter on the Individual, Vesna Wallace, 2004, ISBN 978-0-9753734-1-5
- Nagarjuna's Reason Sixty, Joseph Loizzo, et al., 2007, ISBN 978-0-9753734-2-2
- Kalacakra Tantra: The Sadhana Chapter, Vesna Wallace, 2010, ISBN 978-0-9753734-4-6
- Tsong Khapa's Extremely Brilliant Lamp, Robert Thurman, 2010, ISBN 978-1-935011-00-2
- The Range of the Bodhisattva, Lozang Jamspal, 2010, ISBN 978-1-935011-07-1
- Consciousness, Knowledge, and Ignorance, Bina Gupta, 2011, ISBN 978-1-935011-03-3

=== With Hay House ===
- My Appeal to the World, 14th Dalai Lama, Sofia Stril-Rever, compiler, Robert Thurman, foreword, 2015, ISBN 978-0967011561
- The Dalai Lama and the King Demon: Tracking a Triple Murder Mystery Through the Mists of Time, Raimondo Bultrini, 2013, ISBN 978-0967011523
- A Drop from the Marvelous Ocean of History, Lelung Tulku Rinpoche XI, 2013, ISBN 978-0967011592

== Film and media ==
- His Holiness the Great 14th Dalai Lama of Tibet recorded a video message for the 34th annual benefit concert of Tibet House US, Office of His Holiness the Dalai Lama
- First 30 Years of Tibet House
- God and Buddha: A Dialogue with Deepak Chopra and Robert Thurman, Mystic Fire Video, ASIN: B0000C23DQ
- Robert A. F. Thurman on Buddhism, Wellspring, ASIN: B00005Y721

== See also ==
- Dalai Lama
- Tibetan people
- Tibetan Buddhism
- Tibetan art
- Tibetan Sovereignty Debate
- Government of Tibet in Exile
- List of organizations of Tibetans in exile
- 1959 Tibetan uprising
- Sinicization of Tibet
