= Roots Picnic =

Annual music festival

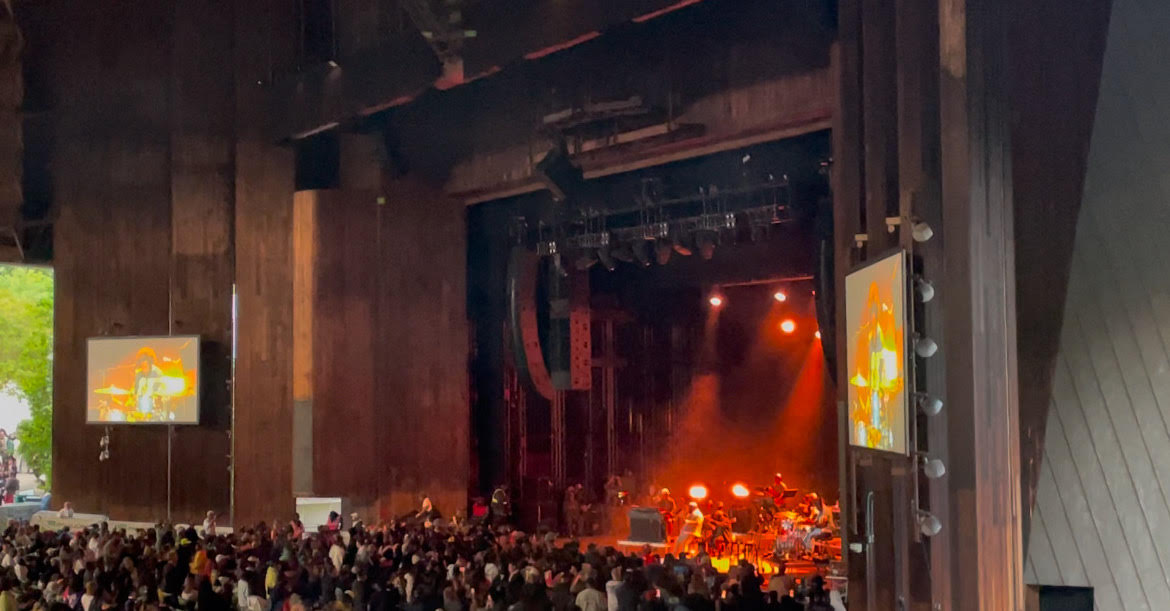
- The Roots at the 2025 Roots Picnic for the 30 year anniversary celebration of Do You Want More?!!!??!
- Genre: Hip hop, R&B, reggae, funk, hard rock, rock, blues, contemporary, electronic, americana, folk, metal, indie, jam band, jazz, pop
- Locations: Mann Center in Fairmount Park; previously at Festival Pier at Penn's Landing
- Years active: 2008–present
- Founders: The Roots
- Website: rootspicnic.com

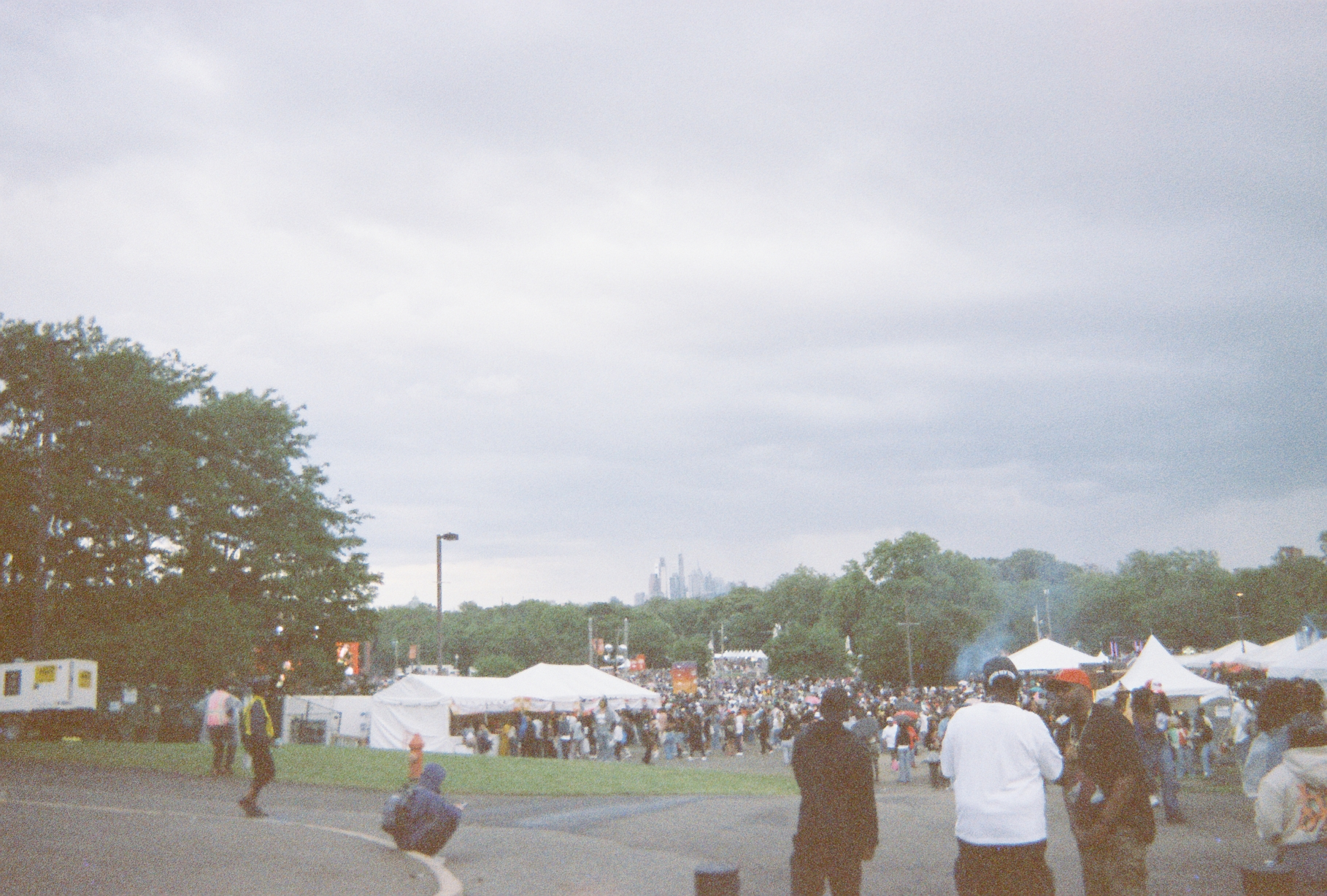
The Roots Picnic 2025 at Fairmount Park

The Roots Picnic is an annual music festival created and hosted by hip hop group The Roots. The festival is held in the Roots' hometown, Philadelphia, Pennsylvania, at the Mann Center in Fairmount Park. The first festival was held on June 7, 2008. Co-founder, Shawn Gee, and manager of The Roots serves as executive producer of the festival.

The festival is a one-day event but for one year it was expanded for two-days in 2012. It was expanded again in 2022. Another festival was held outside of Philadelphia in 2016, with Roots Picnic Experience being held at the Hollywood Bowl in Los Angeles, California.

== Lineups by year ==
=== Inaugural Roots Picnic ===
June 7, 2008

- The Roots, Gnarls Barkley, Sharon Jones & the Dap-Kings, Santogold, Deerhoof, J*Davey, Diplo, Esperanza, DJ Jazzy Jeff, The Cool Kids

=== 2nd Annual Roots Picnic ===
June 6, 2009

- Main Stage: The Roots, TV on the Radio, The Black Keys, Public Enemy, Antibalas, Santigold, Busdriver, Elevator Fight featuring Zoë Kravitz, DJ Cash Money
- Second Stage: Kid Cudi, Asher Roth, Writtenhouse, Back to Basics (King Britt & Dozia), Dave P., Francis and the Lights, Bajah + The Dry Eye Crew

=== 3rd Annual Roots Picnic ===
June 5, 2010

- The Roots, Vampire Weekend, Method Man, Ghostface Killah, Raekwon, John Legend, Mayer Hawthorne & the Country, The Very Best, Das Racist, Nneka, Clipse, DJ Jazzy Jeff, Jay Electronica, Bajah + The Dry Eye Crew, Tune-Yards, The Foreign Exchange, Pattern Is Movement, Memory Tapes, DJ Diamond Kuts, Money Making Jam Boys

=== 4th Annual Roots Picnic ===
June 4, 2011

- Main Stage: The Roots, Nas, Wiz Khalifa, Esperanza Spalding, Edward Sharpe and the Magnetic Zeros, The Dismemberment Plan, Little Dragon, Railbird, Ariel Pink's Haunted Graffiti, DJ J Period
- Vitamin Water Uncapped Stage: Yelawolf, Mac Miller, Black Thought, Man Man, Live Mixtape, Nicos Gun, Hank & Cupcakes, Donn T, OCD/Reda, Young Vipers, T. Millz

=== 5th Annual Roots Picnic ===
June 2, 2012

- The Roots, De La Soul (backed by The Roots), Wale, Flosstradamus, Danny Brown, James Murphy (DJ set), The Hood Internet, Kids These Days, Mr. MFN eXquire, Shabazz Palaces, St. Vincent, Star Slinger, OCD: Moosh & Twist, Stretch Armstrong, Tune-Yards

June 3, 2012

- The Roots, Kid Cudi, Major Lazer, Rakim (backed by The Roots), Diplo, Chill Moody, Quadron, Jessi Teich, Gianni Lee, Selah Sue, Reda, Grand Prize Winners, From Last Year

=== 6th Annual Roots Picnic ===
June 1, 2013

- Gary Clark Jr, Grimes, Macklemore & Ryan Lewis, Naughty By Nature (backed by The Roots), Solange, DJ Premier, The Gaslamp Killer, Trinidad Jame$, Joey Bada$$, Hit-Boy, How To Dress Well, Robert Glasper, Sonnymoon, Jennah Bell, Lushlife

=== 7th Annual Roots Picnic ===
May 31, 2014

- Columbus Stage: The Roots, Snoop Dogg (backed by The Roots), Janelle Monáe, The War on Drugs, Jhené Aiko, G-Eazy, Rudimental, Bad Rabbits, Emily Wells, Electric Wire Hustle
- Oasis Stage: AraabMuzik, Action Bronson, A$AP Ferg, Biz Markie (DJ set), Just Blaze, Chill Moody, Roman Gianarthur

=== 8th Annual Roots Picnic ===
May 30, 2015

- Pier Stage: Erykah Badu (backed by The Roots), The Weeknd, A$AP Rocky, Phantogram, Chronixx and the Zincfence Redemption, Rae Sremmurd, Moses Sumney
- Harbor Stage: DJ Mustard, Raury, Hiatus Kaiyote, Bishop Nehru, Marc E. Bassy
- Oasis Stage: Hudson Mohawke, DJ Windows 98, Afrika Bambaataa (DJ set), King Britt, Brianna Cash, Donn T

=== 9th Annual Roots Picnic ===
June 4, 2016 (Philadelphia)

- North Stage: Future, Blood Orange, Swizz Beatz, Jidenna, Migos, Willow Smith, Paris Monster, GoGo Morrow
- South Stage: Usher (backed by The Roots), Leon Bridges, DMX, Kehlani, Anderson .Paak & The Free Nationals, Ibeyi, Lolawolf, Jodie Abacus
- Oasis Stage: Kaytranada, Metro Boomin, Everyday People feat. DJ Moma, Lil Uzi Vert, Lil Dicky, Rich Medina, Tish Hyman, Chloe x Halle

October 1, 2016 (New York)

- 5th Ave Stage: D'Angelo & John Mayer (backed by The Roots), X Ambassadors, DJ Questlove, Kevin Gates, Jungle Brothers, Emily Wells, Smashng Hrts, DJ Swizzymack
- 6th Ave Stage: Everyday People feat. DJ Moma, Stretch & Bobbito, Lady Leshurr, Neal Brennan, Chargaux, Chill Moody, Tish Hyman

October 2, 2016 (New York)

- 5th Ave Stage: David Byrne x Nile Rodgers x Wu-Tang Clan (backed by The Roots), Trombone Shorty & Orleans Avenue, Swizz Beatz, Deerhoof, Lil Uzi Vert, Echosmith, Daniel "Bambaataa" Marley, Bibi Bourelly
- 6th Ave Stage: DJ Jazzy Jeff, Black Thought's Live Mixtape, Grits & Biscuits, Jerrod Carmichael, EPMD, Yuna, Kyra Caruso

=== 10th Annual Roots Picnic ===
June 3, 2017

- North Stage: Pharrell (backed by The Roots), Lil Wayne, Thundercat, Black Thought & J.Period Live Mixtape featuring Fat Joe, Mobb Deep & Scott Storch, Michael Kiwanuka, Noname, Anthony Somebody of quiteHYPE
- South Stage: Solange, Jeezy, Kimbra, 21 Savage, PnB Rock, James Vincent McMorrow, Tunji Ige
- Oasis Stage: Gilles Peterson, MC Earl Zinger, A Boogie wit da Hoodie, Playboi Carti, Pete Rock, DJ Spinna, DJ N.O.C., DJ Diamond Kuts
- Gaming & Culture Stage: Fashion & Lifestyle Panel, Madden & NFL 2K Competitions hosted by iPodKingCarter

=== 11th Annual Roots Picnic ===
June 2, 2018

- North Stage: The Roots Jam Session hosted by Dave Chappelle with 2 Chainz, Brandy & special guests, 6lack, DJ Drama presents Gangsta Grillz with special guests, Black Thought & J.Period Live Mixtape feat. Fabolous & Jadakiss, GoldLink, Rapsody, Jojo Abot, Capa Artist
- South Stage: Lil Uzi Vert, Dvsn, Dirty Projectors, Rich the Kid & Jay Critch, BadBadNotGood, Sun Ra Arkestra, DJ Diamond Kuts, Zahsosaa
- Oasis Stage: The Diplomats, Grits & Biscuits, DJ Kid Capri, DJ SpinKing, Tierra Whack, Bri Steves
- Podcast Stage: Drink Champs, On One with Angela Rye, Questlove Supreme, ItsTheReal, The Realest Podcast Ever
- Gaming/Culture Stage: "Barrier Breakers" Panel featuring Bozoma Saint John, Shari Bryant, Jemele Hill, Amber Grimes & Anowa Adjah, "Keynote of Change" Conversation featuring Wallo267 & Fox TV host Quincy Harris, Art & Fashion Panel featuring Timothy Anne Burnside, Kerby Jean-Raymond, Distortedd & Tiffany Reid, Madden & NBA 2K Tournaments curated by iPodKingCarter

=== 12th Annual Roots Picnic ===
June 1, 2019

- Fairmount Park Stage: The Roots performing Things Fall Apart 20th Anniversary, H.E.R., 21 Savage, Lil Baby, Davido, City Girls, Ari Lennox, Tobe Nwigwe, Leven Kali, Asiahn
- The Mann Stage: Raphael Saadiq vs. Soulquarians, Black Thought & J.Period Live Mixtape feat. Yasiin Bey, Queen Naija, Tank & The Bangas, Blueface, Moonchild, Resistance Revival Chorus, &more
- Cricket Wireless Stage: The Joe Budden Podcast, DJ Aktive, The Read, Questlove Supreme, The Originals feat. DJ Clark Kent, Stretch Armstrong, D-Nice, Rich Medina & Tony Touch, Guys Next Door Podcast, DJ R-Tistic

=== 13th Annual Roots Picnic Virtual Experience ===
Originally scheduled for May 30, 2020, the festival was moved to August 1 due to the COVID-19 pandemic. Eventually, the festival was cancelled, replaced with a livestreamed show on June 27, 2020 in partnership with Michelle Obama's When We All Vote organization.

- Performances: H.E.R., Lil Baby, Roddy Ricch, SZA, Kirk Franklin, Snoh Aalegra, D-Nice, Polo G, G Herbo, Musiq Soulchild, EarthGang
- Appearances: Michelle Obama, Janelle Monáe, Tracee Ellis Ross, Kerry Washington, Tom Hanks, Liza Koshy, Chris Paul, Elaine Welteroth, Lin-Manuel Miranda, Deon Cole, Coach K, Wallo267, Ghetto Gastro

=== 14th Annual Roots Picnic ===
June 4, 2022

- Toyota Soundstage: Aquil Dawud, Ambré, Serpentwithfeet, Ckay, Robert Glasper & Bilal, Mickey Guyton, Black Thought Live Mixtape featuring Rick Ross & Benny the Butcher, Jazmine Sullivan, Mary J. Blige & The Roots
- TD Pavilion at the Mann: Kur, Alex Isley, Tye Tribbett, Babyface Ray, D-Nice, Masego, G Herbo
- Podcast Stage: Around the Way Curls, FAQ Podcast with Fuzzy and Quincy Harris, Disruptors in the Culture with J Ivy, Coodie & Chike, Carefully Reckless with Jess Hilarious, Whoreable Decisions, Million Dollaz Worth of Game

June 5, 2022

- Toyota Soundstage: Jordan Hawkins, Mumu Fresh, Kirk Franklin, DJ Jazzy Jeff and Rakim, Protoje, Tierra Whack, Soulquarians featuring Musiq Soulchild, SWV and Keyshia Cole, Wizkid, Summer Walker
- TD Pavilion at the Mann: Suzann Christine, Durand Bernarr, Tone Stith, Freddie Gibbs, Yebba, Chief Keef, Kamasi Washington
- Podcast Stage: Jemele Hill is Unbothered with Dawn Staley, Podcast Bols, Questlove Supreme with Robin Thede, Love + Grit, Earn Your Leisure, New Rory & Mal

=== 15th Annual Roots Picnic ===
The initial lineup included Diddy backed by the Roots; he was dropped from the event due to "unforeseen circumstances."

June 2, 2023

- Wells Fargo Center: Dave Chappelle and The Roots

June 3, 2023

- Park Stage: Ms. Lauryn Hill (featuring surprise guests The Fugees), Lil Uzi Vert, Soulquarians with The Isley Brothers, State Property Reunion, Adam Blackstone with Mary Mary & Coco Jones, Uncle Waffles, Mike Phillips, N3wyrkLA
- Presser Stage: Syd, Glorilla, Rare Essence, Backyard Band, Dvsn, Symba, Fridayy, Akin Inag & Inutech
- Podcast Stage: DJ Akademiks, Lip Service with Angela Yee, Pour Minds, Questlove Supreme, Trap Nerds

June 4, 2023

- Park Stage: Usher, J.Period Live Mixtape featuring Black Thought, Busta Rhymes & Eve, Ari Lennox, City Girls, Maverick City, Little Brother, DJ Spinall, Box Boys
- Presser Stage: Lucky Daye, DJ Drama, Kindred the Family Soul, Saucy Santana, Yussef Dayes Experience, Rocky, Dappa
- Podcast Stage: Charlamagne tha God, Don't Call Me White Girl, Love + Grit Philly, People's Party with Talib Kweli, The Office XIV

=== 16th Annual Roots Picnic ===
Victoria Monét and Tyla were originally billed but pulled out of performing due to health issues.

June 1, 2024: Mann Center in Fairmount Park, Philadelphia, Pennsylvania

- Jill Scott, Nas, Sexyy Red, The-Dream, Smino, Wallo & Gillie, J.Period Live Mixtape featuring Black Thought, Method Man & Redman (with surprise guests Common, Freeway, and A$AP Ferg), Robert Glasper & Yebba, Marsha Ambrosius, Funk Flex, October London, Shaboozey, OT7 Quanny, R&B Only, They have the range, Q, Kenya Vaun, Chioke, The True Confessions Podcast, Siangie Twins, DJ RL, DJ Doc B, DJ Aktive

June 2, 2024: Mann Center in Fairmount Park, Philadelphia, Pennsylvania

- Lil Wayne & The Roots, André 3000, Gunna, Babyface, Adam Blackstone & Fantasia, Cam'ron, Wale, Tasha Cobbs Leonard, Backyard Band with Scarface & Amerie, Tonight's Conversation, Leon Thomas, U+Me+RnB, Blk Odyssy, N3wyrkla, Julian King, Jerk x Joloff, Juan EP is Life, DJ Diamond Kuts, DJ Aktive, DJ RL, DJ Doc B

=== 17th Annual Roots Picnic ===
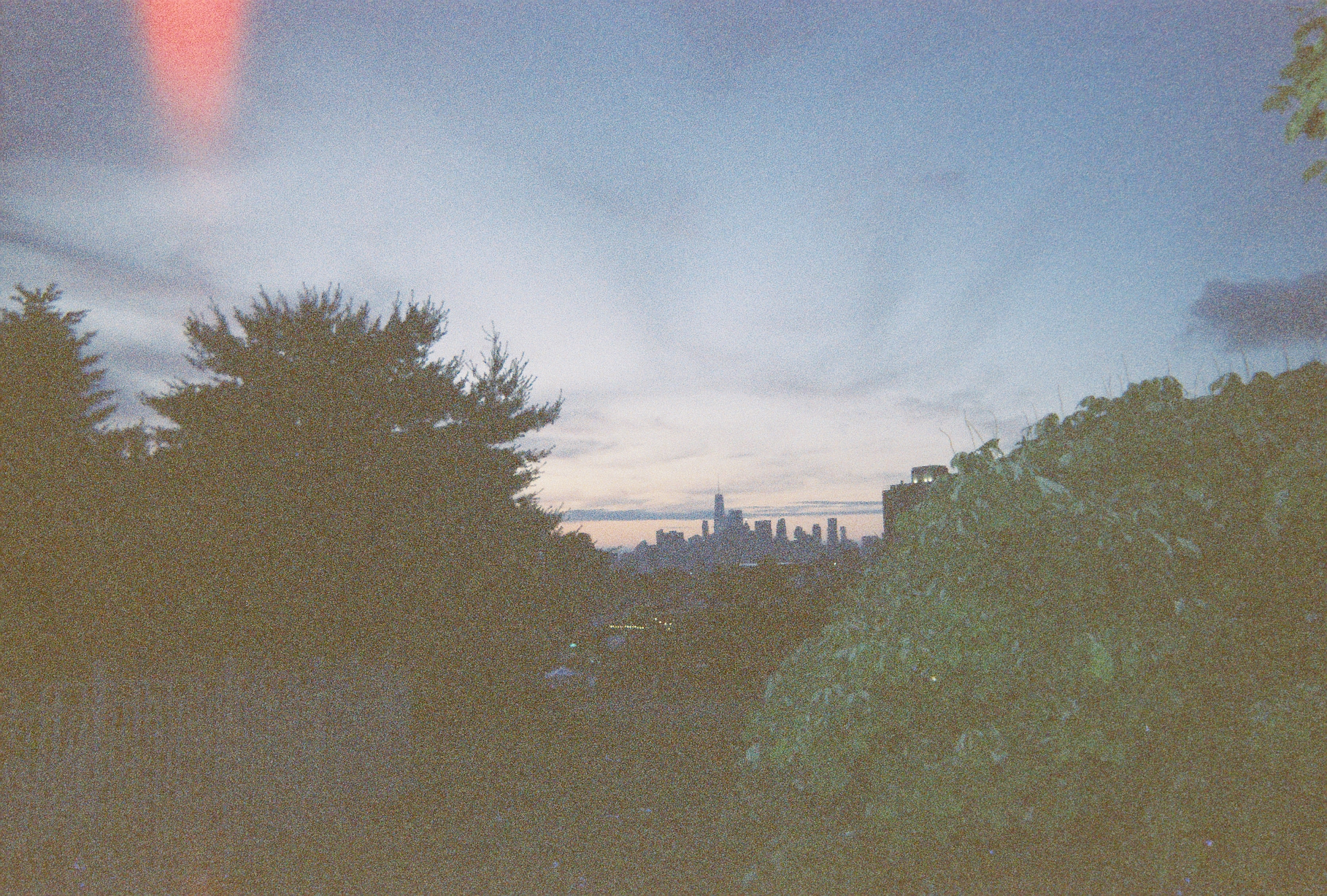
The Roots Picnic in 2025

D'Angelo was originally billed but pulled out due to a medical issue.

May 31, 2025, Mann Center in Fairmount Park, Philadelphia, Pennsylvania

- Fairmount Park Stage: Siange Twins & Domiio, Leeyuh Neptune, Elmiene, Glorilla, Tems, Miguel, DJ Diamond Kuts, Maxwell
- Mann Stage: Fatt Mack, Lady Alma, Kur, Philly Black Pride, Jeezy, Musiq Soulchid, Latto
- Toyota Music Den: Keeyen Martin, Kur

June 1, 2025, Mann Center in Fairmount Park, Philadelphia, Pennsylvania

- Fairmount Park Stage: Peyton, Jermaine Dolly, Rich Medina featuring Crystal Waters & Cece Peniston, J. Period Live Mixtape (Black Thought, 2 Chainz, Clipse), Adam Blackstone featuring Jagged Edge & Total, Lenny Kravitz, Funk Flex, Meek Mill
- Mann Stage: Snacktime, Laila!, Lay Bankz, Backyard Band & Ceelo Green, The Roots, Kaytranada
- Parkside Stage: Kirk Franklin's Sunday Stage, All Spice World Dance, Chill Vibes Experience (DJ Aktive, Raheem Devaughn & Estelle), The Remedy featuring Rich Medina & Cosmo Baker
- Toyota Music Den: Ayden Musica, Brandon Woody, Tiana Major9

==== A Roots Picnic Experience: The Class of '95 ====
June 8, 2025, Hollywood Bowl in Los Angeles, California

- The Roots, Lil' Kim, Method Man & Redman, Bone Thugs-n-Harmony, DJ Quik, Raekwon, E-40, Goodie Mob, Havoc

=== 18th Annual Roots Picnic ===
May 30-May 31, 2026, Belmont Plateau in Fairmount Park, Philadelphia, Pennsylvania

- Jay-Z & The Roots, Erykah Badu, Kehlani, Brandy, T.I., Mariah the Scientist, J. Period Live Mixtape (Black Thought, Wale), Jermaine Dupri, De La Soul, Bilal, Corrine Bailey Rae, DJ Jazzy Jeff, Destin Conrad, Kwn, Joe Kay, Sasha Keable, Celebrating Waiting to Exhale soundtrack (Adam Blackstone, Yolanda Adams, Ledisi, Tamar Braxton, Andra Day), A Celebration of 50 Years of Go-Go (Noochie, Kenny Burns), Funk Flex, Amir Ali, Beano French, Infinite Coles, DJ Diamond Kuts, DJ Cash Money, DJ Aktive, DJ Doc B, DJ Miss Milan, DJ Kid Roc, Ray Bae the DJ

==== A Roots Picnic Experience: A Great Night in Hip-Hop ====
June 27, 2026, Hollywood Bowl in Los Angeles, California

- The Roots, Nas, T.I., Bun B, De La Soul

== See also ==
- The Roots
