= The Last Night (video game) =

Video games

- Developer: Odd Tales
- Publisher: Odd Tales
- Director: Tim Soret
- Composers: Lorn; Joe Kataldo
- Engine: Unity
- Platforms: Windows; Xbox
- Genre: Platform game
- Mode: Single-player

The Last Night is an upcoming cinematic platform game by Odd Tales. Announced in 2014, it is expected to be released on Windows and Xbox.

== Gameplay ==
The Last Night is a 2.5D platform game, where the player controls Charlie, a lower-class man living in an "era of leisure" where computers and machinery have taken over all menial work.

== Development ==
The basis of The Last Night came from a six-day cyberpunk-themed game jam that brothers Tim and Adrien Soret participated in June 2014. Their browser game of the same name won for the best overall game and best aesthetics out of 265 entries; the game VA-11 HALL-A was also first developed at the same game jam. They described it as "Blade Runner + delicious pixels", with heavy inspiration from cinematic platformer Flashback (1992), along with Another World (1991) and Oddworld: Abe's Oddysee (1997). They used pixel art for the game jam, being the easiest to implement in a short amount of time, and starting with the styles set by Gods Will Be Watching and Sword & Sworcery as these games' characters with long, spindly legs were easier to animate. The brothers made the game jam version of their game available for free download at itch.io, allowing others to try it outside the game jam. Several outlets praised the title for its visuals that captured the atmosphere of Blade Runner and other cyberpunk works.

At the time of the game jam, the brothers had been working on a fantasy, Studio Ghibli-inspired platformer called Behind Nowhere; as of 2015, the game remained unfinished. They brought in a few additional team members to form their studio, Odd Tales, and develop The Last Night in full. Among changes was to create their own pixel art style. By October 2014, the Sorets had announced plans to release the game for Microsoft Windows and PlayStation 4 with an anticipated 2016 release. In expanding their development, the team decided to create the game around the idea of postcyberpunk, in which the narrative focuses on a character "anchored in their society rather than adrift in it", a statement describing the genre made by Lawrence Person on Slashdot in 1998. Adrien, the younger brother, left the project in December 2016 to pursue his own career.

In February 2017, Raw Fury announced it would help publish the title for Odd Tales. The game's first reveal was shown during Microsoft's presentation at Electronic Entertainment Expo 2017 in June 2017, as an Xbox One console launch exclusive alongside the Microsoft Windows version. The game was expected to launch worldwide in 2018. However, at the end of 2018, Soret reported via Twitter that due to "massive business, legal & funding issues" that forced them to delay the game, to pull a planned trailer to be shown during The Game Awards 2018, and seek out additional funding support. Raw Fury announced they had parted ways with Odd Tales around the same time, leaving Odd Tales to continue their work through self-publishing.

In a message to PCGamer in December 2021, Soret said "We're confidently building The Last Night brick by brick, taking our time to carefully design, document & implement each part of the game, from evolving our visual style for next-gen to designing dozens of accessibility options", and while they expected to be able to discuss more about the game in 2022, did not yet have any planned release window for it.

== Controversy ==
Following the game's premiere during Microsoft's presentation at E3 2017, Tim Soret was noted to have previously posted statements around 2014 and since on social media that were seen as pro-Gamergate, and antifeminism. Coupled with the descriptors used within the game's marketing material, such as "second-class citizen" and "gamified existence" which were seen as aligned with these views, some took to Odd Tales and Raw Fury to have them stop publishing the game. Tim replied following this that his stance from his previous position has since changed, and that The Last Night was in no way meant to be commentary surrounding the Gamergate controversy. He apologized for his past tweets while on stage during the PC Gaming Show the next day, stating "They don't in any way represent where I am today or what The Last Night will be about". Raw Fury supported Tim, stating: "The comments Tim made in 2014 are certainly surprising and don't fit the person we know, and we hope that everyone reading this who knows us at Raw Fury on a personal and professional level knows that we wouldn't tolerate working with someone who portrays the caricature of Tim going around the internet right now."

In an interview with Vice, Tim Soret said that while The Last Night has themes that others see as right-wing, such as criticizing the concept of universal basic income, his goal with the game is not to be critical of these elements, but only to describe a world that took a certain trajectory to implement these elements, for better or worse, and explore the new problems that were introduced. Soret compared this approach to the movies Gattaca and Wall-E, neither of which he felt politicized the situation and further supported the belief that the tweets had been overblown by a few people trying to create a controversy to benefit themselves. The controversy around Soret and The Last Night led to the situation being called a "Milkshake Duck", a meme introduced about a year prior but that gained wider usage following this controversy.
