= Docena, Alabama =

Unincorporated community in Alabama, United States

- Unincorporated community
- Location within Alabama Location within the United States
- Coordinates: 33°33′34″N 86°55′52″W
- Country: United States
- State: Alabama
- County: Jefferson
- Elevation: 610 ft (190 m)
- Time zone: UTC-6 (Central (CST))
  - Summer (DST): UTC-5 (CDT)
- ZIP code: 35060
- Area codes: 205, 659
- GNIS feature ID: 151755

Docena is an unincorporated community in Jefferson County, Alabama, United States. Docena is 8 miles (13 km) west-northwest of downtown Birmingham and has a post office with ZIP code 35060.

== History ==
Docena is a community in the Warrior coal field in unincorporated western Jefferson County, enclosed within the corporate limits of Adamsville. The compact former mining village is accessed off of Minor Road between Oakwood Drive and the Adamsville Industrial Park. The area of the present village of Docena was first developed in 1905 by the Colored Methodist Episcopal Church as a campus for their planned college. The development was called Booker or Booker City for educator Booker T. Washington, and was being developed by the Booker City Land Development Company on behalf of the church. During that development, it came to the attention of the Tennessee Coal, Iron and Railroad Company (TCI) that the area provided good access to the Pratt Seam of coal, part of the Warrior Coal Fields. The company arranged to trade the Booker City land for a site in the Vinesville district of Interurban Heights, near which the TCI-built industrial city of Corey (later Fairfield) would later be laid out. The CME campus was built there, and is now known as Miles College.

TCI opened the Number 12 Pratt Mine into the Pratt seam near the former Booker City and built a stockade for the leased convicts it obtained from the state. Prisoners were brought to the site on the Kansas City, Memphis and Birmingham Railroad, and the same line was used to haul their mined coal to coke ovens for use at the company's Ensley Works. After the prisoners moved on to other mines, the stockade was dismantled and tents erected for incoming mine workers.

In 1912, under the direction of company president George Gordon Crawford, the practice of convict leasing was abandoned at TCI's mines. Planning began for a new "model mining village" in line with the company's new policy of welfare capitalism. The company hoped to attract better quality, more settled and dedicated workers by creating a company-owned village with modern sanitation, orderly houses, schools, churches, and recreation opportunities.

In this case, and at the suggestion of railroad engineer Ed F. Stallingworth, the planned village was given a "Spanish" theme, with the name "Docena" (Spanish for "twelfth") to reflect its connection to the No. 12 mine. The central village park was labelled the "prado" (Spanish for "meadow") and its company store or commissary called the "Mercado" (Spanish for "market").

Under the direction of John Rigney, a grid of long blocks was laid out, each bisected longitudinally by a service alley. The first houses were of the 4-room square top, pyramid-roof type that characterizes many industrial houses of the early 20th century. Each house had a yard and a privy building at the alley which contained a coal scuttle and garbage bin, all serviced by TCI sanitation department trucks. In the center of town a row of two-story supervisors' houses and two "tacherages" were built, housing the teachers at the Docena School and Docena Colored School.

Later workers' houses, built after 1915, were constructed in other styles with varying rooflines, including shotguns, 6-room duplexes, and 4-room gabled houses with attached porches. At this time, renters were given limited options for paint colors.

The village was racially segregated with the white workers and their families living on the higher ground near the center and southern sections of the town and colored workers on the northern part of the village. Lots for churches and schools were provided, for whites on the prado and for African Americans in the northeast section. On a knoll at the eastern edge of town were provided a baseball diamond, a clubhouse and a Masonic lodge. A pay office was located in the southwest of town, closer to the mine entrance.

In 1913 TCI reorganized their health department, hiring Lloyd Noland to supervise from a made-to-order infirmary in Fairfield. A medical dispensary with one doctor and an assistant was opened in Docena, providing free services to those miners who opted into the company's $1.25/month "medical list." The company also provided social workers to each of its villages. Mary Dolliver, the social worker sent to Docena, kept a "community house" with a full slate of programs for children and wives aimed at applying modern scientific ideas about proper housekeeping and social health. A later social worker was Miss Bingham.

In 1916 residents of Docena participated in a major pageant, called Wenonah: The Magic Word produced through the company schools to celebrate the establishment of a new model village at Wenonah. Other recreational and artistic opportunities included industrial league baseball, weekly dances, community sings, company sponsored lectures and literature libraries covering technical topics on mining and manufacturing, and various competitions for gardening and decorating the houses.

The town was expanded to accommodate a wartime boom in demand for steel in 1918. Renovations to existing houses provided running water and, in some cases, indoor toilets. At that time starting wages for a miner were $2 per day and renting a cottage cost $6 per month, with utilities included.

The program of social welfare continued at full strength through the 1920s, but the company's commitment to it was tested by numerous factors that emerged during the Great Depression of the 1930s. The workforce at the Docena mine was reduced from over 1,000 to a total of 78 by 1933. The company deferred rent on the miners' houses and utilities and doled out credit at the company store (a move derided as giving out "pity slips" by the miners).

The company's schools were turned over to the Jefferson County School System in 1932 and the social science department was dismantled the following year.

During the Second World War, employment in Docena reached a peak of 1,228. These workers were more mobile and less dependent on the company for goods, services and recreation. In 1952 all the village real estate was sold to the John W. Galbreath Real Estate company ("America's foremost broker of company towns.") to be subdivided and sold. Many of the homes were remodeled or expanded by Galbreath prior to sale. TCI workers living in the houses were given the first option on the properties, with the company offering a financing plan to help them make the transition from renters to owners.

On February 8, 1961, the mine shut down for good. In the years since, the village gradually lost most of the unique elements of its role as a model village. The schools were closed by the county after the mine closed. The club house was dismantled for home sites. The former ice house was purchased and renovated by Docena United Methodist Church (which itself closed in 1977). The old pond was drained. The Docena Post Office was established, later given the ZIP code 35060. A post office called Docena has been in operation since 1952.

The clubhouse for African-Americans burned, along with the Masonic lodge, in 1980. Several of the houses have also been destroyed or dismantled. Others have been extensively modified or enlarged. Most of the privy buildings have been removed.

The mercado, which stayed open as the Lucky Shopping Center, managed by A. J. Tortorici, closed soon after the post office was relocated to a manufactured building nearby in the late 1990s. The churches have remained active and a new storage building and Boy Scout meeting hall were built near the baseball field. The Adamsville Industrial Park, adjoining the town to the south, included a small retail strip as well as nearby opportunities for employment which have sustained the village as a residential neighborhood.

== Demographics ==
Historical population
| Census | Pop. | Note | %± |
|---|---|---|---|
| 1950 | 1,551 | | — |
| 1970 | 1,140 | | — |
U.S. Decennial Census

Docena was listed on the 1950 and 1970 U.S. Censuses as an unincorporated community, each time with a majority black population.

Population by Race & Gender: African American 252 (58%); White 179 (42%); Female 188 (44%); Male 243 (56%)

== Notable person ==
- Jan Willis, professor of religion at Wesleyan University
- Brian McCoy, contributing writer for Huffington Post, Ebony Magazine and NAACP activist
- Otis Thornton, Major League Baseball catcher for Houston Astros
