= Otis Thornton =

American baseball player (1945–2025)

- Catcher
- Born: June 30, 1945; Docena, Alabama, U.S.
- Died: May 3, 2025 (aged 79); Birmingham, Alabama, U.S.
- Batted: Right Threw: Right

MLB debut
- July 6, 1973, for the Houston Astros

Last MLB appearance
- July 6, 1973, for the Houston Astros

MLB statistics
- Games played: 2
- At bats: 3
- Hits: 0
- Stats at Baseball Reference

Teams
- Houston Astros (1973)

Otis Benjamin Thornton (June 30, 1945 – May 3, 2025) was an American baseball player who was a catcher in Major League Baseball. He played for the Houston Astros, appearing in both ends of a doubleheader played at Montreal's Jarry Park Stadium on July 6, 1973. He is one of the very few players to have played his entire MLB career outside the United States.

== Career ==
Thornton was selected in the 68th round (817th overall) by the Houston Astros in the 1965 June amateur baseball draft out of Westfield High School in Docena, Alabama.

Thornton played one day of Major League Baseball. He played in both games of a doubleheader for the Astros against the Montreal Expos at Parc Jarry in Montreal, Canada, on Friday July 6, 1973. In the first game, a 12-8 win for the Expos that the Astros had led 7-1, he was put in defensively as catcher in the bottom of the eighth inning for Skip Jutze, as Dave Roberts (pitcher) scored as a pinch-runner. He then was pitch hit for by Rafael Batista in the ninth inning. In the second game, a 14-6 win again for the Expos, Thornton again substituted for Jutze in the 4th inning as part of a double switch. He came to bat first in the top of the fifth inning striking out against Expos starting pitcher Mike Torrez. His next at-bat was in the top of the 7th inning. He stuck out again against Torrez for the last out of the inning. He came to bat for his last time in the 9th inning against Mike Marshall with the bases loaded and hit a ground-out to 2nd baseman Pepe Frias who threw the ball to first baseman Ron Fairly for the out. He finished his career 0-3 with 1 RBI and a .000 batting average.
