= Itsthereal =

Hip-hop duo from New York

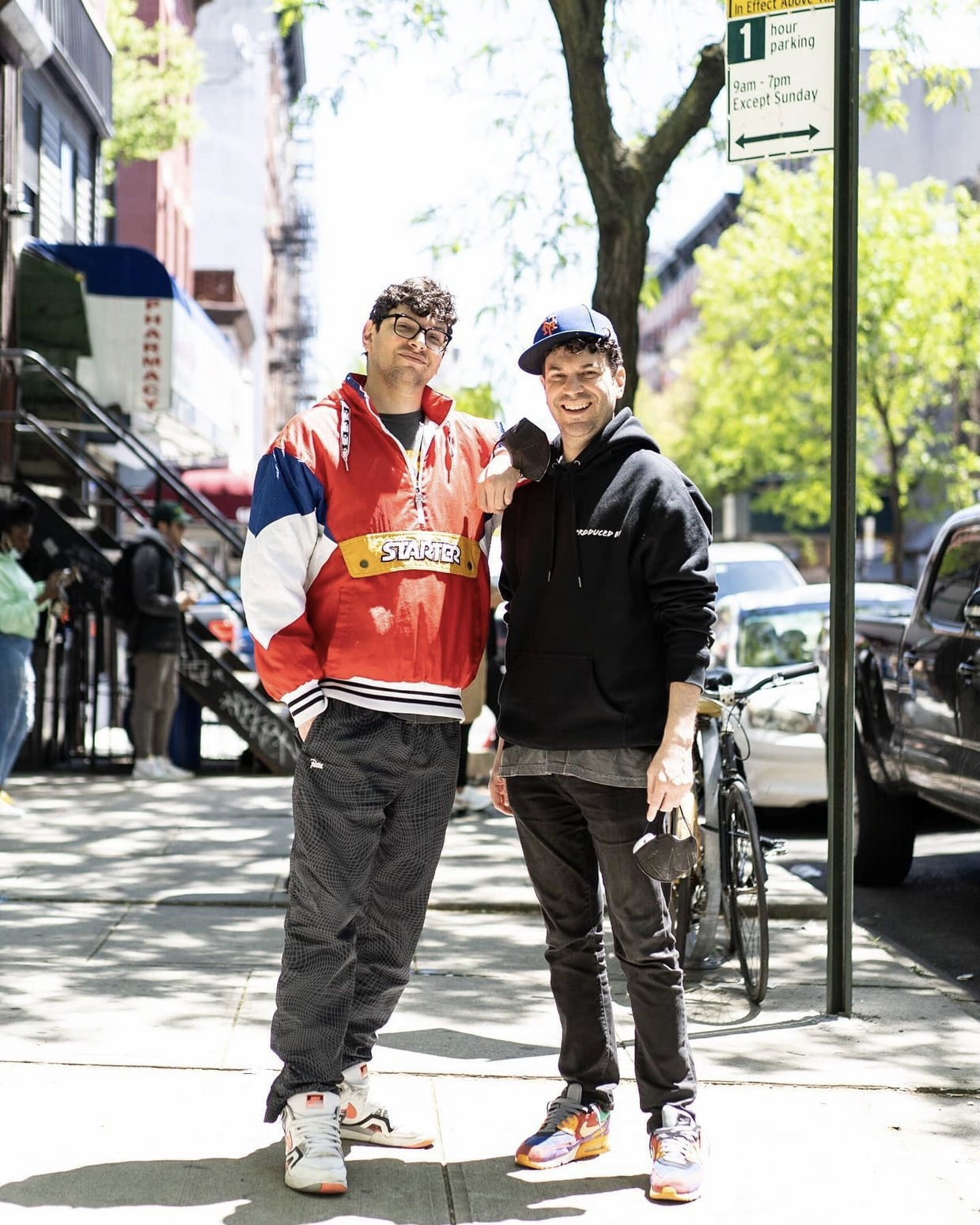
Brothers Jeff and Eric Rosenthal (L to R), together known as the hip-hop sketch comedians ItsTheReal

ItsTheReal, also known as Jeff and Eric Rosenthal, are two brothers from Harrison, New York, who have been active in the hip-hop music scene for over fifteen years.

== Prior to ItsTheReal ==
Eric was Kanye West's videographer at the 2005 Grammy Awards in Los Angeles, CA.

Jeff worked for the HBO and AOL comedy website ThisJustIn.com

== Hip-Hop Sketch Comedy Videos ==
The Rosenthal brothers began self-releasing their weekly sketch videos in 2007 after an idea for a half-hour show based around interviews, sketch videos and live performances was turned down by multiple media companies. Their first video was titled "Deconstructing Biggie" and was featured on Complex, as one of the best viral videos of the 2000s, as well as Pigeons and Planes. Cameos on the program over the next three and a half years included Cam'ron, Max B, Slaughterhouse, Bun B, Clipse, Pete Wentz, Travie McCoy, Amanda Seales, Nick Cannon and more.

== Podcasts ==
After spending more than 3 years working on sketch comedy, putting out videos almost every Monday, the duo moved into the realm of interviews, working for MTV. They joined forces with Jensen Karp to host the podcast "Hypemen" which ran from August 2010 until July 2011.

In May 2015, the brothers returned to podcasting through a deal with Sideshow Network. Their new podcast "A Waste of Time with ItsTheReal" would feature Eric and Jeff engaging in authentic and hilarious conversation with rappers, tastemakers, and industry veterans, all from their Upper West Side apartment. Guests have included Cardi B, Trevor Noah, Rick Ross, John Legend, Lil Uzi Vert, Wiz Khalifa, Jemele Hill, Mac Miller, Jerrod Carmichael, Rembert Browne, Angie Martinez, Director X, Swizz Beatz, and many more over their first 300 episodes. The Rosenthals worked with Fullscreen from June 2016 through November 2016 on simulcasting A Waste of Time with ItsTheReal on Fullscreen's new video platform.

In December 2016, the Rosenthals announced a new partnership for the podcast, moving to the Loud Speakers Network. ItsTheReal went independent in 2018.

In April 2023, ItsTheReal partnered with Pharrell Williams and OTHERtone to release their ten-part narrative podcast about the all-important bridge between MySpace/Napster and the streaming services, The Blog Era. The Blog Era was honored four times - including winning gold in the documentary category - at the 2nd annual Signal Awards.

== 2J3BD ==
In November 2017, The LOX guested on an episode of A Waste of Time with ItsTheReal to promote their new EP, Filthy America... It's Beautiful. Before they arrived, Styles P and Jadakiss took edibles; Sheek Louch was sober. Jadakiss fell asleep during the interview and would occasionally wake up, singing New Edition songs. Styles and Sheek took the time to go off on tangents, including arguing about films. Eric suggested that Styles and Sheek start a movie-related podcast; Styles countered with a different idea: one that involved Eric, Jeff, Styles and Sheek, called "2 Jews and 2 Black Dudes Review the Movies."

Over the next handful of years, Styles, Sheek, Eric, Jeff and Jadakiss - who was a regular on the show - would get together sporadically at the D-Block Studios or Eric and Jeff's Upper West Side apartment and record a couple dozen episodes based around viewings of movies like Coco, You've Got Mail, Trading Places, Jurassic Park, The Last Dragon, Home Alone and more.

By the second half of 2024, The LOX and ItsTheReal had decided to make an earnest attempt at a consistent schedule and a social media presence that emphasized their filmic takes, unique banter and comedic sketches like Is Jadakiss Italian, Karate Man and What's Sheek Mad About.

In May 2025, the show was officially rebranded as 2J3BD, formally acknowledging the contributions of two Jews and three Black dudes: Eric, Jeff, Styles, Sheek and Jadakiss.

The show went to a weekly schedule, with episodes including Sinners, The Departed, Juice, The Fugitive, The Social Network, Big Trouble in Little China and more, highlighted by sold out live shows at The Bronx Brewery and The Bell House in Brooklyn.

== Music ==
Right before Election Day 2010, ItsTheReal released a song called "My Girl's a Republican," which gained notoriety from the clever one-shot music video, as well as for the Tea Party's opposition to it.

In 2013, the Rosenthals worked with DJ Drama and released their first mixtape, Urbane Outfitters. Urbane Outfitters featured the singles "Beef Wit Us" featuring Maino and "Girls With the Dirty Souths" featuring Bun B. Also on the mixtape: Lil Jon, Freeway and Hannibal Buress. The street single "Jews for Jesus Piece" hit the e-streets soon thereafter. The album resulted in the duo making the front page of the New York Times Arts section.

ItsTheReal released their second music project, the full-length Teddy Bear Fresh on May 26, 2017. The street singles "Dave Matthews Bands" and "Fire in a Crowded Room (Get the Hose)" featuring Michael Christmas were followed by "Waco." The album, which NYLON called "not only killer comedy, but also one of 2017’s more complete and enjoyable rap records thus far," was produced by Greg Mayo and features appearances from Curren$y, Smoke DZA, Bun B, Tunji Ige, Jazz Cartier, Michael Christmas, Angie Martinez, Just Blaze, Combat Jack, Scott Rogowsky, and Sway Calloway.

== Live Performances ==
ItsTheReal performed twice at the 2012 Bonnaroo Music and Arts Festival.

Eric and Jeff headlined their own concert at Gansevoort NYC on September 17, 2015, called The YOLONO Tour (You Only Live One Night Only) where their performed their own songs, told stories from their career, and brought out special guests like Bun B, Joell Ortiz, Bridget Kelly, DJ Clark Kent, Miss Info, MC Jin, Torae and Smoke DZA.

ItsTheReal sold out their headlining show at New York City's famed music venue SOB's, called "Your Girl's Tour," on February 23, 2017. OG Chase B served as the opening DJ, Just Blaze DJ'd during ItsTheReal's set, and Freeway performed as a special guest.

On July 26, 2017, ItsTheReal sold out Highline Ballroom in New York City, for a live podcast celebrating the legacy of Roc-A-Fella Records, bringing together Biggs, Hip-Hop, Lenny S, Chaka, Just Blaze, Young Guru, Jim Jones, Young Gunz and Freeway, all on one stage.

ItsTheReal made their international live event debut by interviewing acclaimed DJ Semtex in front of a sold-out crowd at London's Hoxton Sq. Bar & Kitchen on September 6, 2017. They have since performed in Los Angeles and returned to the SOB's stage in January 2018.

ItsTheReal played the 2018 Roots Picnic.

ItsTheReal returned to Highline Ballroom with The LOX on October 3, 2018, in the first live performance of 2 Jews and 2 Black Dudes Review the Movies. Jadakiss - a part-time co-host of the podcast - joined Eric, Jeff, Styles and Sheek in watching and debating the 1993 blockbuster movie Jurassic Park along with a packed house of movie fans, LOX fans and humor fans.

== Television ==
Eric and Jeff sold a scripted TV show to MTV in October 2015.
