= Chewbacca Mask Lady =

2016 viral video

- Candace Payne filmed herself in a moment of laughter.
- Starring: Candace Payne
- Release date: May 19, 2016
- Running time: 4 minutes, 4 seconds
- Language: English

Chewbacca Mask Lady (also known as Chewbacca Mom) is a viral video featuring 37-year-old Texan mother Candace Payne filming herself heartily laughing while wearing a mask of Star Wars character Chewbacca. The video was posted to Facebook with the description "It's the simple joys in life...." on May 19, 2016.

== Reaction ==
The video became so popular that Forbes reported that the mask sold out from every online retailer. In response, Kohl's, where the mask was purchased, gave Payne about $2,500 in gift cards, Star Wars toys and 10,000 reward points.

On May 23, 2016, the British television presenters Holly Willoughby and Phillip Schofield wore the masks on This Morning. On the same day, Payne appeared on Good Morning America, where Hasbro gave her more Star Wars toys. Later that day, musical comedy group The Gregory Brothers uploaded an autotuned remix of the video.

Payne appeared on The Late Late Show with James Corden with J. J. Abrams, and appeared on "The Star Wars Show" on the Star Wars YouTube channel on May 25, 2016. She received $7,500 for a Memorial Day weekend visit at Disney's Hollywood Studios, $2,000 to attend Fan Expo Dallas with Chewbacca actor Peter Mayhew, and $400,000 in scholarship money from Southeastern University, bringing the total value of her gift to more than $420,000 as of June 7, 2016.

On May 24, 2016, Facebook CEO Mark Zuckerberg invited Payne to visit the Facebook headquarters in California. As of that date, the video had amassed over 140 million views on Facebook and was the most viewed Facebook Live video of all time. The video also had over three million Facebook "reshares".

Payne visited Hasbro headquarters with her family on June 19 and was presented with a "Chewbacca Mom" action figure. The body looks like Chewbacca, but the head is a representation of Payne, including a removable Chewbacca mask; it also has 13 prerecorded phrases such as "That's not me making that noise, it's the mask," and "I am such a happy Chewbacca." Payne has since signed on as a video blogger with the television network TLC and written a book about her experience Laugh It Up!: Embrace Freedom and Experience Defiant Joy (2017). Payne is a graduate of Ouachita Baptist University.

== Other videos ==
On July 9, 2016, Payne posted a video on Facebook of her cover of Michael Jackson's song "Heal the World" and dedicated it to the victims of the 2016 shooting of Dallas police officers, which happened days earlier in Dallas, near her home. This video, and the widespread perception that it represented a misunderstanding of or a distraction from important issues, was the likely origin of the term milkshake duck, according to the term's creator.

== In other media ==
The video was parodied in the 2018 Disney animated film Ralph Breaks the Internet, the sequel to 2012's Wreck-It Ralph. In the film, before Ralph and Vanellope meet her and while determining which videos must be on BuzzzTube, Yesss and her assistant Maybe see a video entitled "Chewbacca Dad", to which Maybe explains to his boss that it is Chewbacca, but a dad rather than a mom, much to Yesss' annoyance.
