= Jensen Karp =

American rapper

Jensen-Gerard Karp is an American producer, writer, actor, podcaster, gallerist, and former rapper. Previously known by his stage name Hot Karl, he signed a record deal with Interscope in his early 20s and has gone on to produce and write for television and radio.

== Career ==
=== Music ===
Karp was raised in Calabasas, California. After a brief stint in hip-hop at 11 years old signed for management to Ice-T's Rhyme Syndicate, Karp entered the Roll Call freestyle competition on Los Angeles radio station Power 106, during his time at USC, where he lasted a record 45 days on air to become the show's all-time champion. Karp created a demo exhibiting his satirical style and tightly wound rhymes. He eventually signed with Interscope Records for what he said was a million dollars, where he recorded what was to be his debut album, Your Housekeeper Hates You, which included guest appearances by Redman, Kanye West, will.i.am, DJ Quik, Fabolous, Mýa, Sugar Ray, DJ Clue, and MC Serch. However, Interscope informed Karl that his album could not be commercially released due to scheduling conflicts and he decided to leave Interscope. In 2013, Karp recorded his first song in 10 years for his favorite basketball team, the Los Angeles Clippers, at the request of DJ Dense, the team's in-arena DJ.

In 2016, Karp recorded a song titled "Like Riding a Bike", featuring Mike Shinoda from Linkin Park, which is available on SoundCloud.

=== Books ===
Karp co-wrote the book Just Can't Get Enough: Toys, Games and Other Stuff from the '80s that Rocked for Abrams Books with Matthew Robinson. Jensen released his memoir, Kanye West Owes Me $300 (and other true stories from a white rapper who ALMOST made it big), detailing the entire experience in June 2016 with Crown Books.

=== Radio ===
In October 2018, Karp joined the cast of the Kevin and Bean morning show, hosted by Kevin Ryder and Gene "Bean" Baxter on alternative rock station KROQ 106.7 FM in Los Angeles. He had a regular segment called "Get Up on This", based on his podcast. On March 18, 2020, it was announced that the entire morning crew had been let go by KROQ, over the phone at the start of the COVID-19 pandemic. It was reported that the station lost half its audience in the 2 weeks after letting them go as office and car listening fell rapidly across America as the pandemic emerged.

=== Television ===
Karp was a writer for WWE Raw for seven months during 2006.

He also appeared on Season 1 of VH1's Barely Famous playing Erin Foster's boyfriend and was seen numerous times on the final season of Candidly Nicole. Karp also appeared on Comedy Central's @midnight. Karp wrote a sketch on The Late Late Show with James Corden called Drop the Mic, where Corden goes head to head battle rapping a different celebrity each installment. After Late Late Show installments with Anne Hathaway, Kevin Hart, David Schwimmer, and Usain Bolt, TBS bought the concept, which aired 31 episodes starting in 2017. Karp was credited as an executive producer for 7 episodes.

Karp has written for Sacha Baron Cohen's Who Is America? The Grammys, The ESPYs, The MTV Movie Awards, The Masked Singer, and the NFL on Fox.

=== Art ===
From 2004 until 2026 Karp co-owned and operated Gallery 1988, a pop art focused galleries in Los Angeles, California. Gallery 1988 was well known for its annual show, Crazy 4 Cult, where 100 artists reinterpret classic cult movies in their own style. At one time, Karp was also the brand manager and designer for Pete Wentz's Clandestine Industries. His marketing company, Tyson/Givens Design & Marketing created the LOST Underground Art Project for the show's final season and worked with the TV show Breaking Bad. The gallery has also hosted exhibits for The Avengers, Rick and Morty and Star Wars: The Force Awakens.

=== Podcasts ===
Karp hosted a podcast called Hype Men in which he, Eric Rosenthal, and Jeff Rosenthal, aka Itsthereal, discussed hip-hop. It ran from August 2010 to July 2011.

He hosted a show on Earwolf called Get Up on This, in which he, Matthew Robinson, and a guest discussed things they think they should know about. Robinson and Karp also hosted Get Up Off This, the podcast within a podcast where they discuss things that people should not like and other replacements. The show ran from August 2011 until October 2018 with 371 episodes made. Karp and Robinson choose Ali Segel and Erin Mallory Long to replace them as hosts.

He was a frequent guest on Pistol Shrimps Radio, a podcast on Earwolf following a women's recreational league basketball team in Los Angeles. In the halftime "Sock Report" segment, Karp discusses the socks of Pistol Shrimps and opposing players. In the second season of Pistol Shrimps Radio, Karp's character changed to "Greg Escalante," who later revealed he was Jensen Karp hiding from the Church of Scientology.

On July 1, 2020, Karp and his wife, Danielle Fishel, started a new podcast called Talk Ain't Cheap, where they analyze and dissect the Cameo accounts of celebrities. They also launched a Patreon account that grants early access to the show, as well as other podcasts and an interactive Instagram game show called Scorantine. The podcast has drawn criticism as the idea was stolen from the Canadian podcast Blocked Party. The show was originally called Word Up! which is a direct copy of Blocked Party's segment title. Since the summer of 2022 Karp has been producing the podcast Pod Meets World in which three cast members from the 90s sitcom Boy Meets World, Rider Strong, Will Friedle, and Karp's wife Danielle Fishel, watch episodes of the show, and share behind the scenes stories of what it was like to make the show.

== In popular culture ==
Karp appeared on The Howard Stern Show in 2011 to talk about his time in the rap industry and perform The Roll Call with Howard & Lisa G. He also acted as the Creative Director at comedy YouTube Channel, Jash, where he produced and wrote on projects like The ArScheerio Paul Show and the Chance the Rapper music video for "Na Na.". He has written for Rolling Stone, the ESPYs, the MTV Movie and Video Awards, The Late Late Show with James Corden, and Funny or Die.

== Personal life ==
On July 4, 2017, on episode #303 of his podcast Get Up On This, he announced that he was dating actress Danielle Fishel. The two attended high school together but only began a romantic relationship after reconnecting as adults. On March 22, 2018, Fishel and Karp got engaged. They married on November 4, 2018. Fishel announced in January 2019 that she and Karp were expecting their first child in July 2019. Their son Adler Lawrence Karp was born on June 24, 2019, a month early and spent three weeks in the neonatal intensive care unit. Fishel and Karp had a second son in 2021.

=== Cinnamon Toast Crunch incident ===
On March 22, 2021, Karp tweeted a photograph of apparent discarded shrimp tails he claimed to have found in a box of Cinnamon Toast Crunch he purchased, despite the facility not producing a single product containing shrimp. Additionally, Karp said he found a piece of string, "small black pieces" embedded into some pieces of the cereal, and an object that looked like a pea. The tweet about the alleged incident went viral, bringing safety concerns in General Mills' manufacturing process into question. General Mills later issued a statement on Twitter claiming the purported shrimp tails were "an accumulation of the cinnamon sugar that sometimes can occur when ingredients aren't thoroughly blended". A company representative said "that there's no possibility of cross contamination with shrimp." On March 23, General Mills said the company was investigating the case, but that contamination "did not occur at [their] facility." Karp's presence on Twitter ceased at the time of this incident, alongside concurrent accusations of emotional abuse and gaslighting by former romantic partners. His last tweet was posted on 24 March 2021.

== Bibliography ==
- Just Can't Get Enough: Toys, Games and Other Stuff from the'80 that Rocked (2007) Co-written with Matthew Robinson
- Kanye West Owes Me $300: And Other True Stories from a White Rapper Who Almost Made It Big (2016)

== See also ==
- Milkshake Duck
