= Milkshake Duck =

Internet meme

In Internet culture, a Milkshake Duck is a person who gains popularity on social media for some positive trait or traits, but is later discovered to have a distasteful history or to engage in offensive behavior. The term has been connected to cancel culture, a perceived trend of social media, sometimes resulting in celebrities being ostracized and careers abruptly derailed by publicized misconduct.

pixelatedboat
(@pixelatedboat)
tweeted:

The whole internet loves Milkshake Duck, a lovely duck that drinks milkshakes! *5 seconds later* We regret to inform you the duck is racist

12 June 2016

The phrase is derived from a Twitter post made on 12 June 2016 by Ben Ward, an Australian cartoonist using the online handle "pixelatedboat". His Twitter joke describes a fictional Internet viral phenomenon of a "lovely duck that drinks milkshakes" which is immediately discovered to be racist. Ward said the joke was partially influenced by the Chewbacca Mask Lady.

== Notable instances ==
An early example of the phenomenon was observed in October 2016 with Ken Bone during the 2016 United States presidential debates. After initially becoming a viral sensation on social media and receiving multiple corporate sponsorships, Bone began receiving backlash when his questionable Reddit account history was revealed after he hosted a Reddit AMA.

The demonstration of the independently developed video game The Last Night was a highlight of Microsoft's press conference during the Electronic Entertainment Expo 2017 due to its stylish cyberpunk visuals. Then one of its creators, Tim Soret, was found to have spoken in support of the Gamergate harassment campaign in 2014, which led to criticism of his views a day later and tarnished the game's image. Soret apologized the next day and said his views on Gamergate and other matters had since changed. The "milkshake duck" term was quickly applied to the game. Criticism over the game and the subsequent controversy over social media led to wider adoption of the term.

American rapper and singer Doja Cat was declared the Milkshake Duck of 2018 by NME. The recording artist had experienced a viral hit with her single "Mooo!", a novelty song with an absurdist lyrical theme in which she fantasizes about being a cow. Controversy ensued when it was revealed that in a 2015 tweet she had used the homophobic slur "faggot" to describe hip-hop artists Tyler, the Creator and Earl Sweatshirt, members of the musical collective Odd Future. She initially defended her remarks, writing, "I called a couple people faggots when I was in high school in 2015 does this mean I don't deserve support? I've said faggot roughly like 15 thousand times in my life. Does saying faggot mean you hate gay people?" Her response met further backlash, including a critical tweet by Will and Grace actress Debra Messing, expressing disappointment in Doja for defending past ignorance and imploring her to use her fame and platform for good. Doja Cat later issued a series of apologies for her derogatory words and deleted her tweets. The controversy generated much discourse about the limits of "cancel culture".

In 2018, journalist Quinn Norton was announced by The New York Times as their lead technology opinion writer, but the newspaper withdrew the offer the same day after a Twitterstorm revealed old posts from Norton using homophobic and racist slurs, and her friendship with a white supremacist known as weev.

Shortly after his webcomic Strange Planet began to achieve viral success in early 2019, US cartoonist Nathan W. Pyle was described as an example of the milkshake duck phenomenon when a 2017 tweet of his was revealed that expressed anti-abortion views. Pyle said shortly afterward that he and his wife "have private beliefs as they pertain to our Christian faith. We believe separation of church and state is crucial to our nation flourishing", and were supporters of the Democratic Party.

Rod Ponton, a lawyer and former prosecutor, went viral in 2021 as the "Zoom Cat Lawyer". Within a day, reports surfaced that he had previously "used federal agents to torment a former lover with drug raids and bogus charges" in 2014.

In 2021, comedian Jensen Karp went viral for a tweet about finding what appeared to be a shrimp tail in his Cinnamon Toast Crunch cereal. He was later revealed as an alleged abuser by numerous other Twitter accounts.

=== The "reverse milkshake duck" ===
In October 2018, some news outlets used the term "reverse milkshake duck" to describe the reversal of one's public image from problematic to positive. A mother with the Twitter username BlueStarNavyMom3 tweeted a picture of her son, associating him with the #HimToo hashtag, suggesting he was afraid to go on solo dates due to false sexual accusations. The son, Pieter Hanson, was surprised by the post and in a newly created Twitter account posted a message saying the opposite:

That was my Mom. Sometimes the people we love do things that hurt us without realizing it. Let's turn this around. I respect and #BelieveWomen. I never have and never will support #HimToo. I'm a proud Navy vet, Cat Dad and Ally. Also, Twitter, your meme game is on point.

The Verge writer Devon Maloney was one of the first to put a name to the reversal, saying, "In what may have been the internet's first-ever reverse milkshake-ducking, Pieter himself finally logged on a few hours later to clear his name once and for all."

Vox's Aja Romano suggested the phenomenon "might actually be whatever the opposite of a Milkshake Duck is—when a viral moment starts out seeming awful but then becomes unexpectedly good." The Guardian said, "Hanson's story may be one of the first instances of the reversal, as the reality of his personality—a seemingly decent and inspiring young man—is a far cry from the sexist way we were introduced to him." Slate described it as "a viral villain outed as, despite it all, a righteous hero."

== Related concepts ==
A related concept to "milkshake duck" is that of the "problematic fave", a phrase originating on Tumblr, describing a notable and popular person who, despite recent offensive or harmful statements or actions, manages to retain their popularity. Ward was imitating how social media would find dark secrets of public faces who were seemingly decent people which keys the idea that there is something nice about them, but the image is dirtied and they now are seen as problematic.

Polygon writer Julia Alexander argued that terms like "milkshake duck" and "problematic fave" are symptoms of current cultural conflict on the Internet in which users are ready to be outraged and have the ability to search a person's public Internet history to find statements to support that. Alexander suggested that to avoid these labels, one should not worry about what statements they may have made, but whether they show awareness that they made them and that they have grown past or changed away from them.

== In dictionaries ==
In December 2017, the phrase was a runner-up in Oxford Dictionaries' "word of the year", losing out to "youthquake". In January 2018, Australia's Macquarie Dictionary named "milkshake duck" its 2017 "word of the year". The phrase was added to Dictionary.com and described as "a person (or thing) who becomes extremely popular on the internet for some positive reason, but as their popularity takes off and people dig into their past, they quickly become an object of outrage and hatred."

== See also ==
- Skeleton in the closet
