= Vieux Farka Touré =

Malian musician (born 1981)

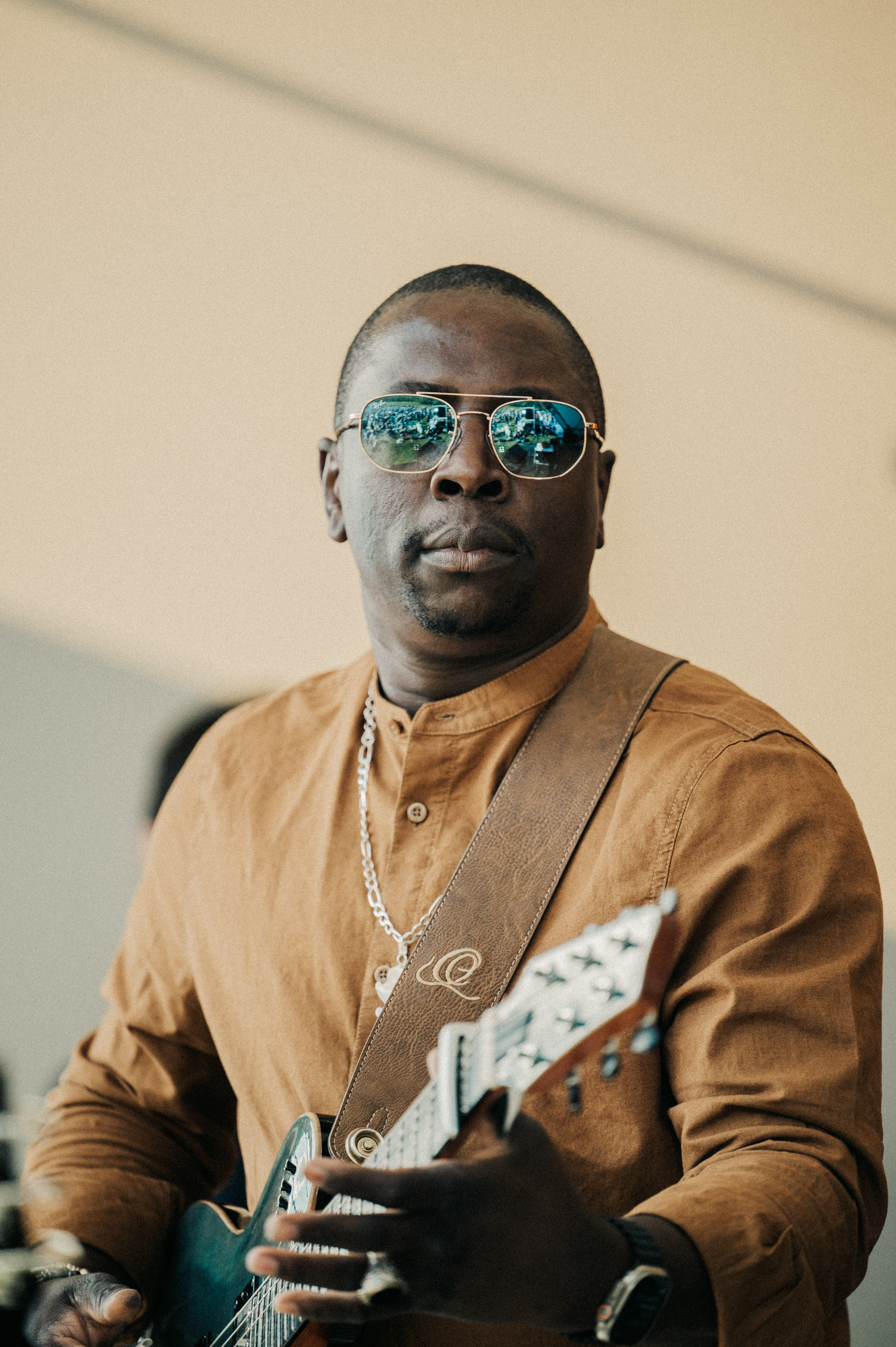
- Touré in 2023

Background information
- Born: 12 March 1981 (age 45)
- Origin: Bamako, Mali
- Genres: Blues; jazz; Malian folk; world music; rock; reggae; soul
- Occupations: Singer; composer; guitarist
- Years active: 2005–present
- Labels: Modiba; Six Degrees; Dead Oceans; World Circuit
- Website: www.vieuxfarkatoure.com
- Father: Ali Farka Touré

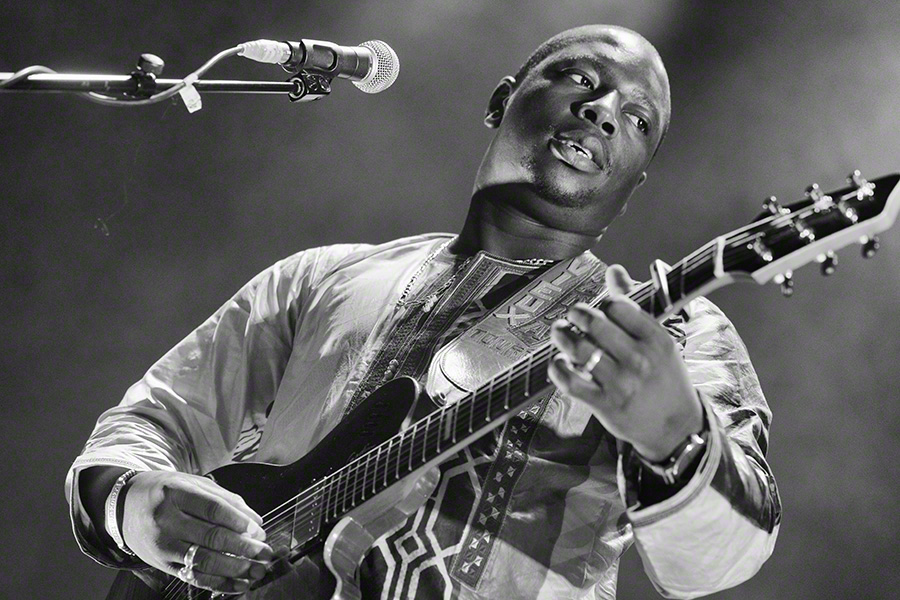
Touré at a concert in Oslo in 2016

Boureima "Vieux" Farka Touré (born 12 March 1981) is a Malian singer, composer and guitarist. He is the son of Malian musician Ali Farka Touré.

== Biography ==
Touré was born in Niafunké, Mali, in 1981 to Ali Farka Touré. Despite his father's discouragement and his family's lineage as a tribe of soldiers, Touré secretly took up the guitar and enrolled in the Institut National des Arts in Bamako, Mali.

In 2005, Eric Herman of Modiba expressed interest in producing an album for Touré; to do so, he had to acquire permission from Ali Touré, Toumani Diabaté, and other community elders. This led to his self-titled debut album, produced by Modiba and released by World Village on 12 February 2007. The album featured Toumani Diabaté as well as his late father, who died in 2006.

Following the release of a remix album, UFOs Over Bamako, in 2008, and multiple tours, Vieux released his second studio album in May 2009. Fondo peaked at #5 on Billboard's World Albums chart the week of 11 July 2009 and was included in the Village Voice's Top 100 list for 2009.

In June 2010, Vieux was invited to perform at the Opening Celebration of the 2010 FIFA World Cup; other performers included Shakira, Alicia Keys and K’naan. That month, Vieux also released his first live album, LIVE.

Vieux released his third studio album, The Secret, on 24 May 2011. The album was produced by Soulive guitarist Eric Krasno and features Dave Matthews, Derek Trucks, and John Scofield. It also features the last collaboration between Touré and his late father. The album reached the number-one spot on CMJ's New World chart on 10 June 2011.

Vieux's fourth studio album, Mon Pays, was released by Six Degrees Records on 28 May 2013. The title, French for "My Country", refers to his native Mali, and serves as a reminder of its beauty and culture, even in the midst of the territorial conflict between Tuareg and Islamic populations that have threatened it since January 2012.

Samba was released in spring 2017. It was recorded in front of a live studio audience in Woodstock, NY. The title "Samba" has nothing to do with the Brazilian style of music; as the second boy in his family Vieux was always called "samba", meaning "second boy" in Songhai, Additionally, the featured song “Samba Si Kairi" is named after a song his father and grandfather would sing while he played the calabash. Dominic Valvona of Monolith Cocktail praises the work, writing: "This is the devotional, earthy soul of Mali, channeled through a six-string electric guitar."

On 10 June 2022, Touré released his sixth solo album, Les Racines, on World Circuit. Les Racines translates as "the roots", a nod to the album returning to the desert blues roots of Touré's father, Ali Farka Touré. The album was recorded in Touré's home studio in Bamako and features a number of Malian musicians such as Amadou Bagayoko from Amadou & Mariam, Mamadou Sidiki Diabaté, and Madou Traore.

In September 2022, Vieux released a cover album of some of his father's songs called Ali, on the Dead Oceans label, collaborating with Houston-based group Khruangbin.

== The Touré-Raichel Collective ==
A chance meeting at an airport in Germany with Israeli singer-songwriter Idan Raichel led to an impromptu get-together at a small studio in Tel Aviv in November 2010. Joined by Israeli bassist Yossi Fine and Malian calabash player Souleymane Kane, this recording session – acoustic, spontaneous and entirely improvised – resulted in the birth of The Touré-Raichel Collective. The group's debut album, The Tel Aviv Session, was released by Cumbancha on 27 March 2012. The Touré-Raichel Collective completed a North American tour in spring 2012 and European tours in autumn 2012 and spring 2013. In 2014, the pair released a second record, The Paris Session, that The New York Times notes "has tracks ranging from a prayer sung in Hebrew to love songs in Bambara, French and Songhai (all languages spoken in Mali)."

== See also ==
- African fingerstyle guitar
- African music

== Discography ==
- Vieux Farka Touré (2006)
- Vieux Farka Touré Remixed: UFOs Over Bamako (2008)
- Fondo (2009)
- LIVE (2010)
- The Secret (2011)
- Mon Pays (2013)
- Touristes (with Julia Easterlin) (2015)
- Samba (2017)
- Les Racines (2022)
- Ali (with Khruangbin) (2022)

=== With the Touré-Raichel Collective ===
- The Tel Aviv Session (2012)
- The Paris Session (2014)
