= Skeleton in the closet =

Undisclosed negative fact about someone

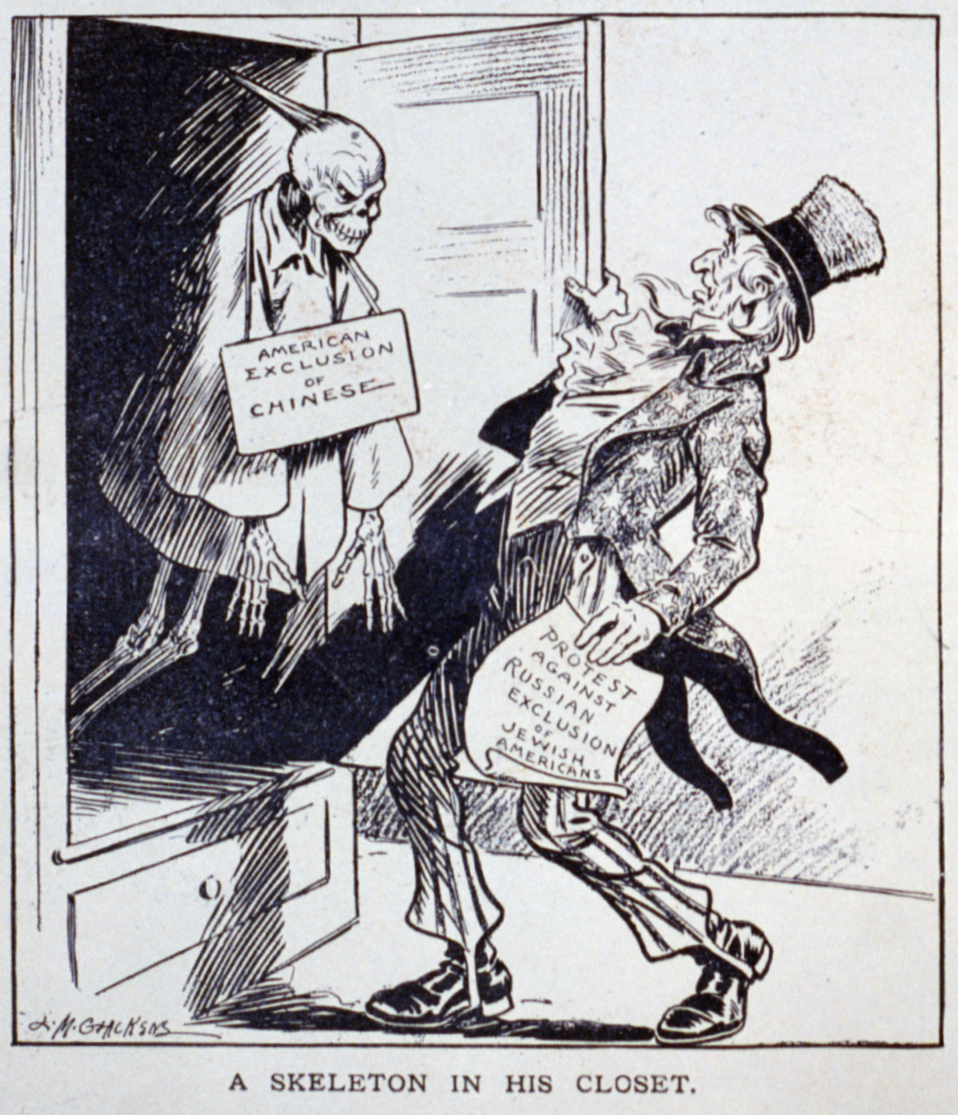
1912 Louis Glackens cartoon using the phrase to mock US criticisms of Russia's exclusion of American Jews given the Chinese Exclusion Act

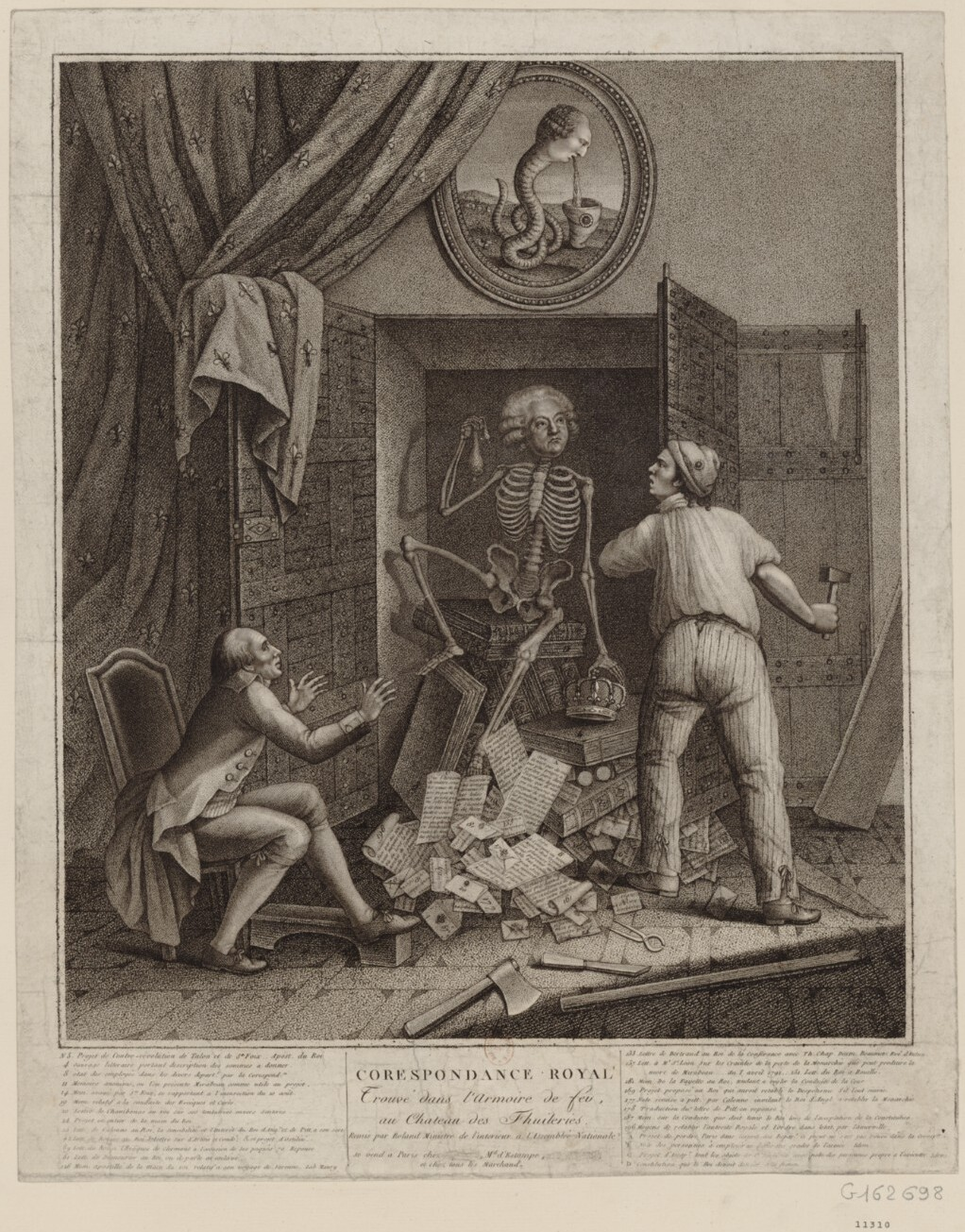
1792 caricature of Mirabeau's skeleton coming out of Louis XVI's hidden closet

Skeleton in the closet (or in British English skeleton in the cupboard) is a colloquial phrase and idiom used to describe an undisclosed fact about someone which, if revealed, would damage perceptions of the person. It evokes the idea of someone having had a human corpse concealed in their home so long that all its flesh had decomposed to the bone.

It is known to have been used as a phrase as early as at least November 1816. In the most derisive of usage, murder, or significant culpability in a years-old disappearance or non-understood event (a mystery), may be implied by the phrase.

== See also ==
- Closeted, describing nondisclosure of sexual or gender identity
- Elephant in the room, an English metaphorical idiom for an obvious truth that is being ignored or goes unaddressed
- Milkshake Duck, an Internet meme describing someone becoming popular, only to be revealed to have a dubious history
- Nigger in the woodpile (archaic) means "some fact of considerable importance that is not disclosed—something suspicious or wrong"
- October surprise, unexpected revelations or discoveries during US presidential elections which can often alter the results of the following November election
