= Julia Easterlin =

American singer-songwriter

- Born: March 14, 1989 (age 37); Augusta, Georgia, United States
- Genres: Chamber-Pop, folk, world-beat
- Occupations: Musician, songwriter, singer, arranger, composer
- Instruments: Voice, ukulele, bass
- Years active: 2011 - Present
- Label: Six Degrees Records
- Website: www.juliaeasterlin.net

Julia Easterlin (born March 14, 1989) is an American singer, songwriter and baritone ukulelist whose music draws from elements of world-beat, chamber-pop, folk and contemporary classical music.

== Biography ==
Julia Easterlin was born into a musical family, and enrolled in a school of fine arts after moving to Augusta, Georgia, at age 6. In 2007, she started studying at Berklee College of Music on a full merit scholarship. Her accomplishments have included performing as part of the TEDxWomen L.A. event in 2011, being named one of only 20 U.S. Presidential Scholars in the Arts in 2008, and performing at the Stockholm Jazz Festival in 2015. She is also lead vocalist of Tuarrah. As of fall 2014 she has also played in 10 Sofar Sounds shows.

Known for her looping technique, Easterlin uses primarily a BOSS RC-50 loop station, a Shure SM58 vocal mic, and, sometimes, a floor tom. The vocal looping technique has since been popularized by Tune-Yards, Andrew Bird, and Imogen Heap. Easterlin's experimental style can be described as a combination of several different musical genres which she came across through her education and upbringing such as jazz, gospel, and Southern folk. She has named Björk and Philip Glass as influences.

== Discography ==
- Go Straightaway! (2012)
- v e s t i g e s (2013)
- Touristes with Vieux Farka Touré (2015)
- Light of a Strange Day (2017)
- Lying on Our Backs with Tuarrah (2020)
