= Zoom Cat Lawyer =

Internet meme

Screenshot from the video

Zoom Cat Lawyer is an Internet meme that emerged in February 2021 when attorney Rod Ponton struggled to disable a cat filter on the video conferencing application Zoom during a civil forfeiture hearing in Texas's 394th Judicial District Court. The attorney's face was digitally altered to look like a gray cat, making it appear as though a cat was participating in a judicial hearing.

== History ==
On February 9, 2021, the YouTube channel for the 394th District Court of Texas live-streamed and published a clip entitled "Kitten Zoom Filter Mishap." Recorded in a period when many formal procedures would be held on virtual conferencing applications due to COVID-19 gathering restrictions, the video features an attorney, Rod Ponton, who accidentally signed in with a white kitten face filter and is attempting to remove it from his Zoom display. In the video, the kitten's eyes appear to dart back and forth when Ponton says, "I don't know how to remove it. I've got my assistant here and she's trying to." Ponton then attempts to move forward, saying, "I'm prepared to go forward with it." Finally, he says, "I'm here live. I'm not a cat." The post later received 3.6 million views on YouTube and over 26.9 million views on Twitter. Ponton told CNN and the Associated Press that he was using his assistant's 10-year-old desktop computer when he logged on to the civil forfeiture hearing. Ponton claimed his secretary or her daughter had last used the image.

After the clip was posted, Judge Roy Ferguson shared the clip on Twitter with a tweet being captioned as "IMPORTANT ZOOM TIP: If a child used your computer, before you join a virtual hearing check the Zoom Video Options to be sure filters are off. This kitten just made a formal announcement on a case in the 394th." Reuters reporter Lawrence Hurley later shared the clip on Twitter. Canadian poet Margaret Atwood praised and also shared the tweet with a caption "I on the other hand am a cat. I just can't get this human filter off." After the incident, Ponton said to The New York Times, "If I can make the country chuckle for a moment in these difficult times they're going through, I'm happy to let them do that at my expense." He said to Vice, "Oh, that was just a mistake by my secretary. I was using her computer and for some reason, she had that filter on. I took it off and replaced it with my face. It was a case involving a man trying to exit the United States with contraband and contraband cash. All it was was a mistake. It was taken off and we had the hearing as normal."

== Reception ==
After the clip grew in popularity, several notable media outlets covered the video, including The New York Times, NBC News, The Wall Street Journal, USA Today, The Guardian, ABC, The Daily Dot, Vice, CNN, and others. Wonderland described it as one of the best memes 2021 produced. Jochan Embley of Evening Standard described it as one of the "Most hilarious Zoom fails in the year". Natasha Hinde of HuffPost listed it among the "most hilarious Zoom moments of all time", while WPBN-TV reported that the meme would be made into a bobblehead by the National Bobblehead Hall of Fame and Museum.

The meme also inspired a prank involving Charles Barkley on Inside the NBA. In a clip in which Minnesota representative Tom Emmer appears upside-down in a virtual US Congress Committee Finance meeting, a co-attendee references the meme, stating, "at least he's not a cat".

The clip also appeared in a Mike's Hard Lemonade commercial.

Ponton has been described as an example of Milkshake Duck, when a person who gained online popularity for a positive or charming trait is later revealed to have a distasteful history. In 2014 Ponton allegedly "used federal agents to torment a former lover with drug raids and bogus charges", which ended up "destroying her business" according to a Reason documentary.
