= Monica Lynch =

- Born: Monica Lynch; Chicago, Illinois, U.S.
- Genres: Hip hop, R&B, Rap
- Occupations: Record producer, record company executive, A&R director
- Years active: 1981–present
- Label: Tommy Boy Records

Monica Lynch (born Chicago, Illinois) is a music business executive, record producer, and former President of hip-hop/dance music label Tommy Boy Records. She has hosted radio programs on free-form WFMU since 1997, and worked as an A&R consultant for Queen Latifah and Martina McBride.

Lynch was born and raised in Chicago, and moved east in the late 1970s. "I was pretty starry-eyed when I got to New York. I came from Chicago to work in a fashion show in '78 and it was one of those impetuous things — I just didn't go back," she said in a 1999 interview. "I had no money, so a make-up artist I knew let me crash on her floor."

According to a 2007 interview in Bust magazine, "Like many of the young hip-hop acts she helped turn into stars in the '80s and '90s, Lynch started out in the business with nothing more than a strong work ethic and a love of music, eventually becoming one of hip-hop's most powerful women. In the 19 years she spent at Tommy Boy, ... Lynch helped launch the careers of major acts, including Afrika Bambaataa, De La Soul, [and] Naughty by Nature."

== Tommy Boy Records ==
Tommy Boy Records was founded by Tom Silverman in 1981, and Lynch was his first employee, hired in December of that year. She was named president of the label in 1985.

"[Lynch] can vividly remember the night in March [1982] when she drove with [Silverman] to the basement studios of WHBI-FM to deliver the [new album by Afrika Bambaataa & Soulsonic Force containing the song "Planet Rock"] to hip-hop DJs Mr. Magic and Marly [sic] Marl, not really grasping that the song would help to launch a sonic revolution whose effects are still being felt today," wrote Randy Reiss at MTV News. "With Sugar Hill being the only rap label with widespread acceptance at the time and other major rap players such as Jive and Priority just getting started, success was a gamble for the hip-hop entrepreneurs." Lynch recalled: "Very soon after [dropping it off], we began hearing ["Planet Rock"] pouring out of windows as Mr. Magic broke the record. For a label that, at the time, was just two people, it was a very heavy experience. This was a period when rap itself was very young, very much like a cottage industry. We were just getting started, Profile was just getting started and Jive wasn't in the rap game yet."

The label did not have immediate followup success. However, as chronicled by the magazine Complex, "After some fallow years, Tommy Boy experienced a rap resurgence, in no small way attributable to the cool aesthetic of [the label's] fashionable president, Monica Lynch, who opened her doors to all kinds of artistic expression." She signed Queen Latifah and De La Soul, and played a key role in the development of the careers of various artists and executives, including RuPaul, Dante Ross, Naughty by Nature, Coolio, House of Pain, Stetsasonic, Force M.D.'s, Soulsonic Force, Digital Underground, 808 State, and Prince Paul.

Lynch helped to develop the label's clothing line (which was designed and overseen by the label's Rap Marketing Director Albee Ragusa). She also helped to produce its popular compilation and soundtrack albums, including MTV Party to Go, Jersey Drive, Nothing to Lose, and others. She also served as art director for many of the label's packages.

About the huge 1991 hit "O.P.P." by Naughty by Nature, Lynch recalled: "Tommy Boy always did well with acts that had something different about them. And with Naughty by Nature, having cornrows and being proud to be from New Jersey was not a very cool thing at the time. Of course, no matter what, a great record trumps everything else. ... [A]nyone from a 3-year-old to a 93-year-old could sing that chorus. It had a nursery-rhyme appeal to it." DJ KayGee of Naughty by Nature credited Lynch for the band's successful branding. "Monica Lynch [at Tommy Boy] is a marketing genius, and she's totally, totally, if not solely responsible for branding Naughty by Nature," KayGee told Spin magazine. "You know that logo? She got Mark Weinberg to draw that logo for us. And that logo he drew at dinner on a napkin with a crayon. ... That's why the original logo has those ridges on it, that's from him pushing down on the crayon and the crayon breaking off."

In 1992 she was given a demo tape of songs by RuPaul. "I thought the idea of a drag queen recording artist would be great if the music was there," she told Paper magazine. "Otherwise it wouldn't stand alone on its two high heels." Lynch did like the music, and signed RuPaul to the label. While working on the artist's premiere Tommy Boy release, Lynch heard a demo of the song "Supermodel (You Better Work)," and added that to the album. She told Paper, "I knew that it was going to be the single."

Lynch originated the massively successful Jock Jams and Jock Rock series of compilations, starting in 1994.

One of her last roles at the label was as a producer of the two-volume film soundtrack compilation albums 54 (Music From The Miramax Motion Picture).

She left Tommy Boy Records in February 1998.

== Post-Tommy Boy career ==
Lynch joined the staff of radio station WFMU in 1997, during a sabbatical from Tommy Boy. At WFMU she hosted a weekly show for many years, and still hosts fill-in programs. "After 16 years at [Tommy Boy], she was burned out by the music business's overwhelming commercial imperative, as well as its constant extramusical annoyances," wrote Jaime Wolf in the New York Times in a station profile from 1999. "[W]orking at WFMU, Lynch says, has helped her reconnect to her original passion. When she talks about her fellow D.J.'s, she quickly falls into a wonderstruck tone, describing their knowledge as 'Talmudic.' Being at the station, she says, is 'like running away and joining the circus.'" Lynch last hosted a regular weekly show on WFMU in 2013, but continues to host sporadic fill-ins.

She served as A&R Director for Queen Latifah's 2004 release The Dana Owens Album, and on Latifah's 2007 followup, Trav'lin' Light. The latter album's co-producer, Ron Fair, referred to Lynch as a "walking encyclopedia" of music. Lynch also served as A&R Director for Martina McBride's 2014 R&B and soul covers album, Everlasting. In 2015 she served as Executive Producer for the Queen Latifah HBO film Bessie.

In 2020, she co-organized for Sotheby's the first auction dedicated to vintage hip-hop art and collectibles. In 2022, Lynch curated the auction for the third consecutive year.
