= Laiya St. Clair =

Radio and podcast personality, producer, and voice artist

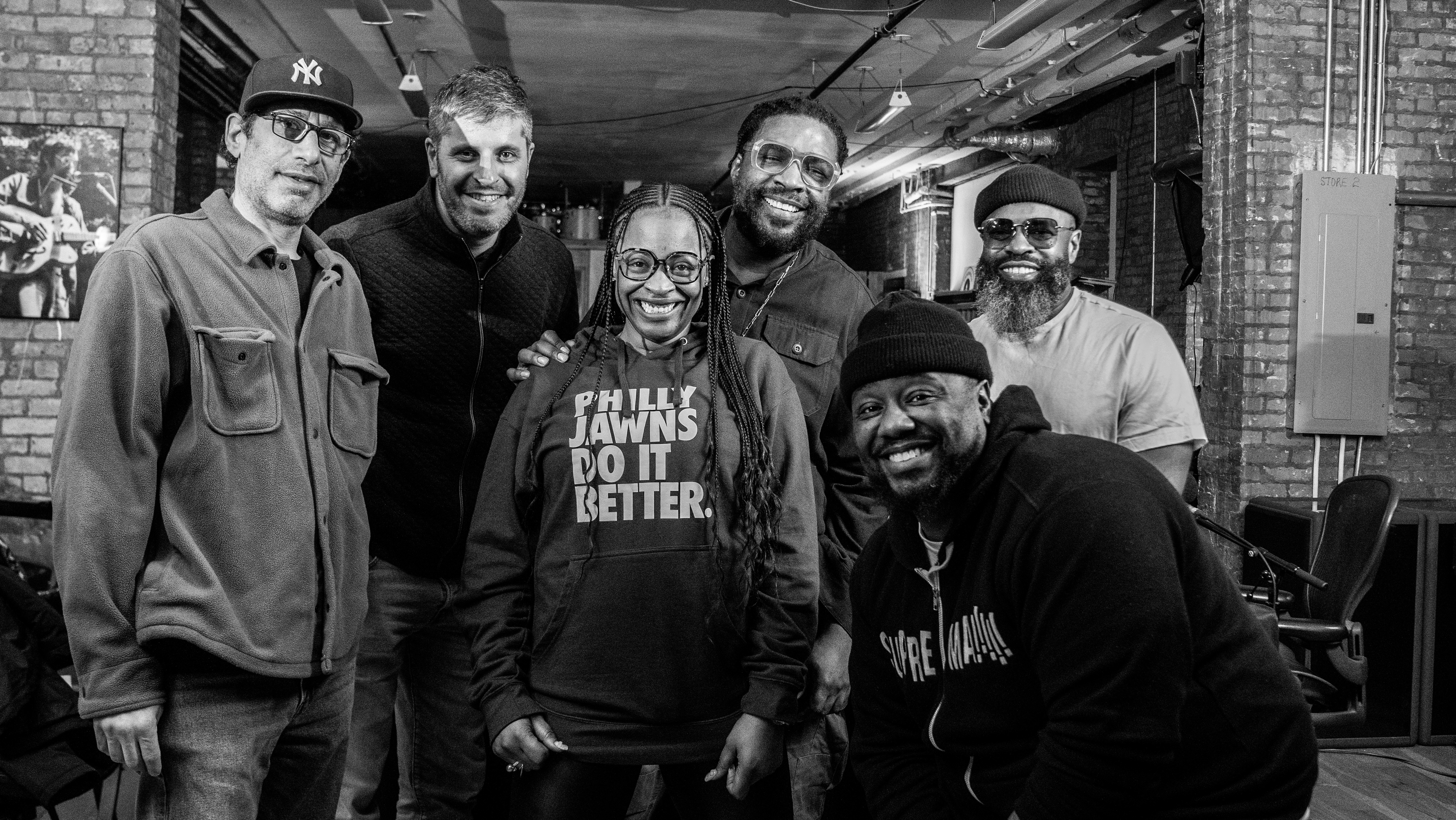
- Laiya St. Clair (middle) with Team Supreme, photographed with Black Thought (guest), Photo by Ginny Suss, 2023
- Born: Laiya St. Clair
- Citizenship: American
- Education: Clark Atlanta University
- Occupation: Broadcaster
- Known for: Team Supreme co-host and producer, Questlove Supreme
- Website: https://www.laiyasworld.co

Laiya St. Clair is a radio and podcast personality, producer, and voice artist.

== Biography ==
St. Clair is from Washington D.C. and received a B.A. in Mass Media Arts from Clark Atlanta University. She moved to Philadelphia, PA in 1999 and currently resides in Los Angeles, CA.

St. Clair was a co-host on "Philly's Morning Show" with Shamara on Hot 107.9, the station's first all-female morning show. She was also a voice artist on the Little Brother studio album, May the Lord Watch. She was also a guest star on the Love & Hip Hop Season 8 TV special, "Love & Hip Hop Awards: Most Certified" that aired April 1, 2019.

She was a member of Team Supreme on the Questlove Supreme podcast on iHeartRadio and a co-producer for the show.

=== Podcasts ===
- Co-host, Team Supreme, Questlove Supreme
- Co-host, Jill Scott Presents: J.ill the Podcast
- Co-host, Love + Grit: The Philly Podcast
