= Noochie =

American rapper

Antwon Vincent, professionally known as Noochie, is a rapper from Washington, D.C., United States. He is the director and executive producer of Live on the Front Porch, a YouTube series that features live musical performances.

== Early life ==
Noochie was born in Northern Virginia but grew up between Southeast DC and other parts of the DC area. He is the oldest of five siblings. His father is rapper Roger "Oneway Boobe" Vincent Jr., founder of OneWay Records.

== Career ==
Noochi worked at his father's music studio as a teenager and took audio mixing courses while recording his own tracks. He moved to Atlanta in 2016 after signing a production deal with Kevin "She'kspere" Briggs and returned to Washington less than a year later. He signed with Atlantic Records in 2017 but ended the relationship with the label in 2019.

Noochie released music independently and promoted it by sharing a video of himself performing on his front porch. The videos were received positively, leading him to launch the performance series, Live on the Front Porch. Guests on the show have included Robin Thicke, Cordae, Anderson .Paak, and Chance the Rapper. Noochie credits live music shows like The Arsenio Hall Show, Soul Train, Rap City, MTV Unplugged, and Live from Daryl's House as inspiring the online show.

In 2024, the John F. Kennedy Center for the Performing Arts announced it would host Noochie for a live Live from the Front Porch performance in the spring of 2025.

== Albums ==
- Product of the DMV (2016)
- Sneaky Tape (2020)
- Sneaky Tape 2 (2023)
- Sneaky Tape 3 (2024)
