= Bajah + The Dry Eye Crew =

Hip hop group in Sierra Leone

Bajah + the Dry Eye Crew
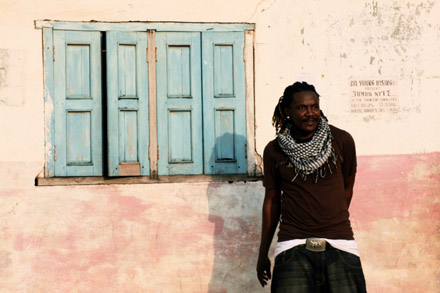
- Pupa Bajah, of Bajah + the Dry Eye Crew

Background information
- Origin: Freetown, Sierra Leone
- Genres: Hip hop
- Years active: 2000-present
- Labels: Modiba
- Members: Pupa Bajah, A-Klass, Dovy Dovy
- Website: www.planetbajah.com

Bajah + The Dry Eye Crew are a hip hop crew, originating in Sierra Leone, Africa, and currently living in New York City. The group are superstars in their native country, filling the national stadium for headline performances, and are currently working on their international debut album. The Crew consists of Bajah, A-Klass, and Dovy Dovy in the United States, who join with the Jungle Leaders when performing in Sierra Leone.

== Musical style ==
Bajah + the Dry Eye Crew’s music blends many influences with hip hop, including funk, dancehall, and reggae. They are part of a growing international hip hop movement, though they are among the first of these acts to gain an international presence, culminating in the upcoming release of their international debut, slated for an early 2014 release under their record labels, Modiba Productions and Nat Geo Music. Their live shows are celebrated for their electricity and the energy they generate in the crowd, and this reputation has earned them confirmed collaborations for their upcoming LP with some of hip hop’s most influential figures, including ?uestlove and Black Thought of The Roots, Talib Kweli, K'naan, Res, and El-P. Production credits for the album include Fyre Dept.—consisting of Grammy-nominated drummer and producer Adam Deitch and recording artist Eric Krasno of Soulive—who have produced for 50 Cent, Snoop Dogg, GZA, Talib Kweli, and Justin Timberlake.

== Origins ==
Bajah + the Dry Eye Crew began performing together in 2000 in a war-torn Freetown, Sierra Leone, quickly gaining a legion of fans who lovingly dubbed them their "voice for the voiceless." Their fans have been known to go to great lengths to express their love for the musicians, even rolling out an impromptu "red carpet" to welcome them to a performance: "When we have a show in the national stadium, you see these guys making a long line, taking off their T-shirts and putting them on the floor so we can walk on it as a mat to go on the stage," A-Klass remembers. Their international visibility began when one of their songs was featured in the Academy Award-nominated film Blood Diamond, starring Leonardo DiCaprio, and continued to grow when the crew released their single "Ease Di Tension" as a free download just before Sierra Leone’s 2007 elections, the first since the beginning of its civil war.

== Activism ==
This type of outreach has gained the group a reputation of humanitarianism and social awareness, which they cite as the inspiration for their moniker: as "dry eye" is a colloquial phrase in Sierra Leone for "boldness." "The kids that always try to ask questions and want to know things are the dry eye. If you always coming up to talk to the elder people, trying to ask them certain questions, they say, 'Oh, you, you're dry eye,' like, 'You're bold. You're too bold!'" Bajah explains. "But we just use dry eye because we decide to talk about the bad things going on. Cause the leaders, we take them as our fathers—but we still gonna say some things, the reality. We just gonna stand, no matter what. No more tears in the eye. We're just gonna stay dry eye and say something. You understand? That's strong."
