= Modiba =

Modiba Productions
- Founded: 2004
- Status: Active
- Genre: Indie
- Country of origin: United States
- Official website: www.modiba.net

Modiba is an artist management and music licensing company dedicated to international artists and social responsibility.

Modiba Productions was founded in 2004 when Wesleyan University seniors Eric Herman and Jesse Brenner created an Afrobeat compilation CD, the profits of which were donated to humanitarian workers in Darfur. The album was called the Afrobeat Sudan Aid Project (ASAP) and has raised over $140,000 for Save the Children in Darfur. In 2007 Modiba signed its first artist, beginning the career of Malian guitarist Vieux Farka Toure, son of the legendary Ali Farka Toure. Acting as record label, Modiba released his self-titled debut and donated 10% of the album's proceeds to their Fight Malaria campaign in Toure's hometown, Niafunké.

Modiba currently manages the careers of Vieux Farka Toure, Bombino, Sierra Leone's Refugee All Stars, Antibalas, The Toure-Raichel Collective, Grupo Fantasma, Brownout, and Aurelio. The licensing and music supervision division -- Modiba Music Works—is helmed by Eileen O'Neill and represents artists, producers, songwriters, composers and labels from around the world, providing international music to the film and television industries.
