= Questlove Supreme =

American music podcast

- Genre: Music podcast
- Language: English

Cast and voices
- Hosted by: Questlove (Ahmir Thompson), Unpaid Bill (Bill Sherman), Laiya St. Clair, Suga Steve (Steven Mandel), and Phonte (Phonte Coleman) and formerly Boss Bill (Bill Johnson)

Production
- Length: 90–180 minutes

Publication
- Original release: September 7, 2016 – April 30, 2025
- Provider: iHeartMedia, iHeart Podcast Network

Related
- Website: www.iheart.com/podcast/1119-questlove-supreme-53194211/

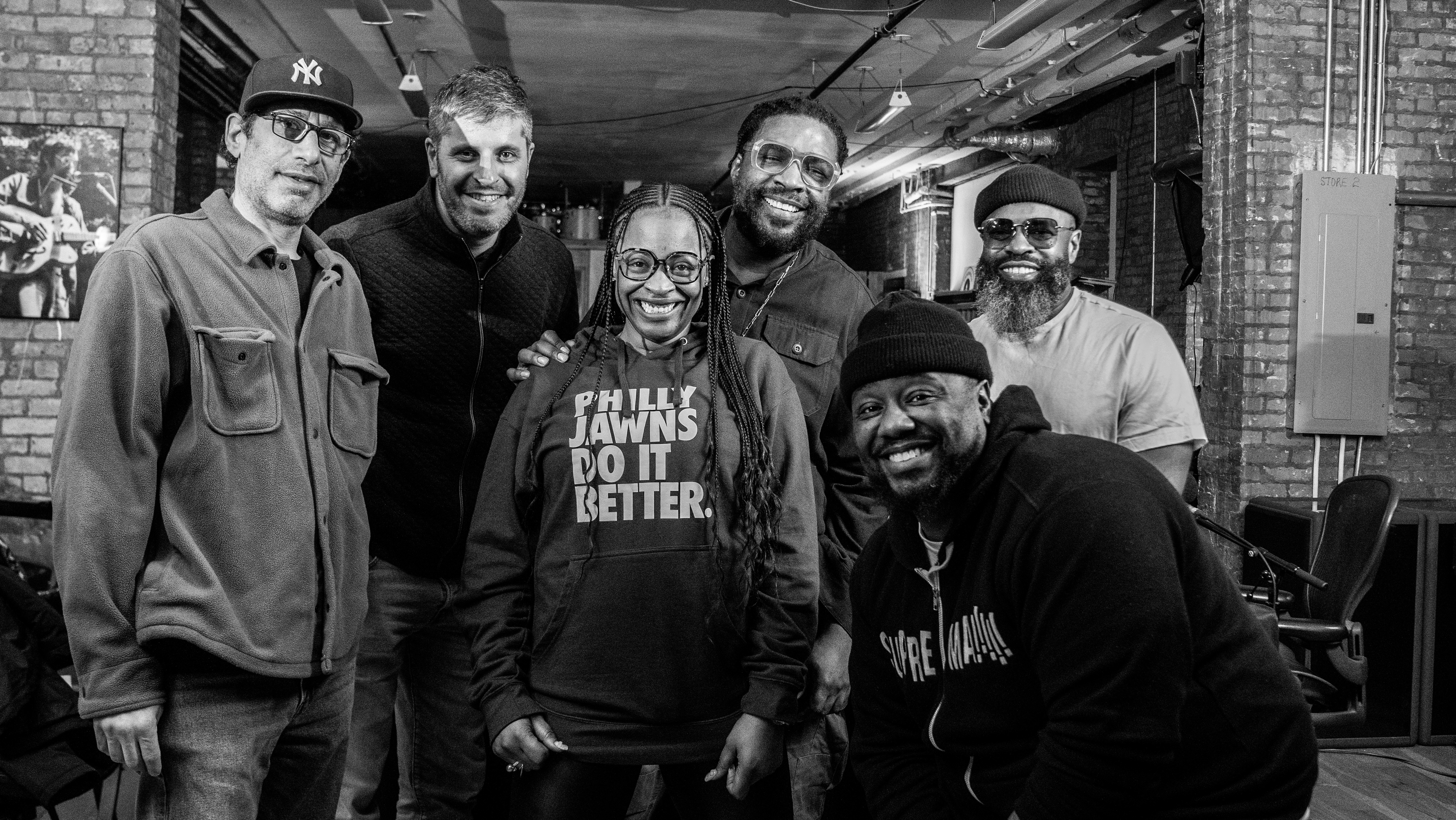
Team Supreme photographed with Black Thought (guest), Photo by Ginny Suss, 2023

Questlove Supreme is a podcast led by Questlove (Ahmir Thompson) now called "The Questlove Show."

Questlove Supreme features interviews with musicians, songwriters, producers, actors, directors, and industry executives. Guests include: Q-Tip, Usher, Carlos Santana, Chris Rock, Bruce Springsteen, Elvis Costello, Maya Rudolph, Solange, Shep Gordon, Steve Miller, "Weird Al" Yankovic, The Revolution, and Chaka Khan. QLS also sometimes features public figures outside the music industry such as John Oliver, Bill Clinton, Stacey Abrams, and Michelle Obama.

== History ==
Questlove Supreme began as an extension of the music courses Questlove taught at New York University and is what he has called a "black nerd version of NPR." To prepare for each episode, Questlove personally listens to around 200 songs.

The first episode was released September 7, 2016.

In 2019 the podcast moved from Pandora to iHeartMedia.

It was previously co-hosted by Team Supreme, which included Unpaid Bill (Bill Sherman), Suga Steve (Steven Mandel), Laiya St. Clair, Phonte (Phonte Coleman) and formerly Boss Bill (Bill Johnson). The final episode with Team Supreme aired on April 30, 2025.

See: List of Questlove Supreme episodes

== Format ==
Questlove Supreme episodes largely began with a musical introduction, where the panelists participated in a "Shabooya Roll Call," an "age-old school bus chant" ad-lib format.

Questlove was the host, with Team Supreme co-hosting, providing additional questions, reactions, jokes, and references. QLS guests are asked about their early musical experiences, influences, and careers, with other off-script questions emerging based on the conversation.

Episodes were released on Wednesdays on multiple streaming platforms on a biweekly basis, with "Questlove Supreme Classic" episodes replayed every other week. QLS also updated a mix of songs referenced on the show.

=== Hosts ===
Questlove has described the choice to have several co-hosts as a way to represent a "broad range of experiences". Co-host Phonte (Phonte Coleman) is a rapper in the hip-hop trio/duo Little Brother and producer. Suga Steve (Steven Mandel) is a music producer on The Tonight Show Starring Jimmy Fallon, co-founder of J.M.I. Recordings, and former engineer at Electric Lady Studios. Unpaid Bill (Bill Sherman) is a composer, producer, arranger, and orchestrator known for his work on In the Heights, Hamilton, and Sesame Street. Laiya St. Clair is a radio host, producer, and voice artist. Boss Bill (Bill Johnson) is a producer.

== Reception ==
Consequence of Sound summed the show up as a "music junkie's dream," specifically for its "handpicked mixtape of Questlove-approved jams."

=== Awards ===
- Webby Award, 2025, Music, Shows (Podcasts)
- Webby Award, 2024, Podcasts - Music (General Series), People's Voice, Podcasts - Music (General Series), Podcasts - Best Co-Hosts (Nominee)
- Music Podcast of the Year, 2023 iHeartRadio Podcast Awards
- Webby Awards 2022, Podcasts - Lifestyle (General Series), People's Voice, Podcasts - Lifestyle (General Series), People's Voice, Podcasts - Music (General Series)
- Webby Awards 2021, Podcasts - Music (General Series)
- Webby Awards 2019, Podcasts - Interview/Talk Show (General Series)
- Webby Awards 2019, Podcasts - Arts & Culture (General Series), For episode "QLS Classic: Lena Waithe"

=== Nominations ===
- Music Podcast of the Year, iHeartRadio Podcast Awards, 2022
- NAACP Image Awards "Outstanding Society and Culture Podcast" and "Outstanding Arts and Entertainment Podcast", 2022
- Webby Awards 2019, Podcasts - Best Individual Episode (Features), For "Ep. 111 ft Patrice Rushen"
- Webby Awards 2018 - Best Host (Features)
