= Jan Willis =

American philosopher

Janice Dean Willis
- Born: 1948 (age 77–78)
- Education: BA and MA degrees in philosophy, Cornell University; Ph.D. in Indic and Buddhist Studies, Columbia University
- Occupation: Professor of Religion
- Employers: Wesleyan University; Agnes Scott College
- Known for: Author of books on Tibetan Buddhism
- Awards: Wesleyan University's Binswanger Prize for Excellence in Teaching, 2003
- Website: https://janwillisweb.com/

Janice Dean Willis, or Jan Willis (born 1948) is Professor of Religion, Emerita at Wesleyan University, where she taught from 1977 to 2013; and the author of books on Tibetan Buddhism. She has been called influential by Time Magazine, Newsweek (cover story), and Ebony Magazine. Aetna Inc.'s 2011 African American History Calendar features professor Willis as one of thirteen distinguished leaders of faith-based health initiatives in the United States. She taught part-time at Agnes Scott College from 2014 to 2020.

Willis grew up in Docena, Alabama (near Birmingham), as the daughter of a Baptist deacon and steelworker. In 1963, she marched with Martin Luther King during his Birmingham campaign. While traveling through Asia during the early 1970s, she became the student of Tibetan lama Thubten Yeshe, who encouraged her academic pursuits. She received BA and MA degrees in philosophy from Cornell University (thesis: History, Faith, and Kerygma; A Critique of Bultmann's Existentialist Theology.), and a Ph.D. in Indic and Buddhist Studies from Columbia University (dissertation: A Study of the Chapter on Reality Based Upon the Tattvartha-patalam of Asanga's Bodhisattvabhumi.).

Since 2006, she has contributed to the group blog On Faith (sponsored by Newsweek and the Washington Post) alongside Elie Wiesel, Desmond Tutu, and Madeleine Albright, among others. In 2003, she was awarded Wesleyan University's Binswanger Prize for Excellence in Teaching.

== Publications ==
She is the author of the following books:

- Dreaming Me: An African American Woman's Spiritual Journey. New York: Riverhead Books, 2001.
- Enlightened Beings: Life Stories from the Ganden Oral Tradition. Wisdom Publications, 1995.
- Feminine Ground: Essays on Women and Tibet. (Editor, and contributor of two of six, essays) Ithaca, NY: Snow Lion, 1989.
- On Knowing Reality: The Tattvartha Chapter of Asanga's Bodhisattvabhumi. Columbia UP, 1979.
- The Diamond Light: An Introduction to Tibetan Buddhist Meditation. New York: Simon & Schuster, 1972.

== Other sources ==
- Paine, Jeffrey. Re-Enchantment: Tibetan Buddhism Comes to the West. Norton, 2004. ISBN 978-0-393-32626-0 Willis's experience with Lama Yeshe is discussed on pp. 64–70.
