= David Gray discography =

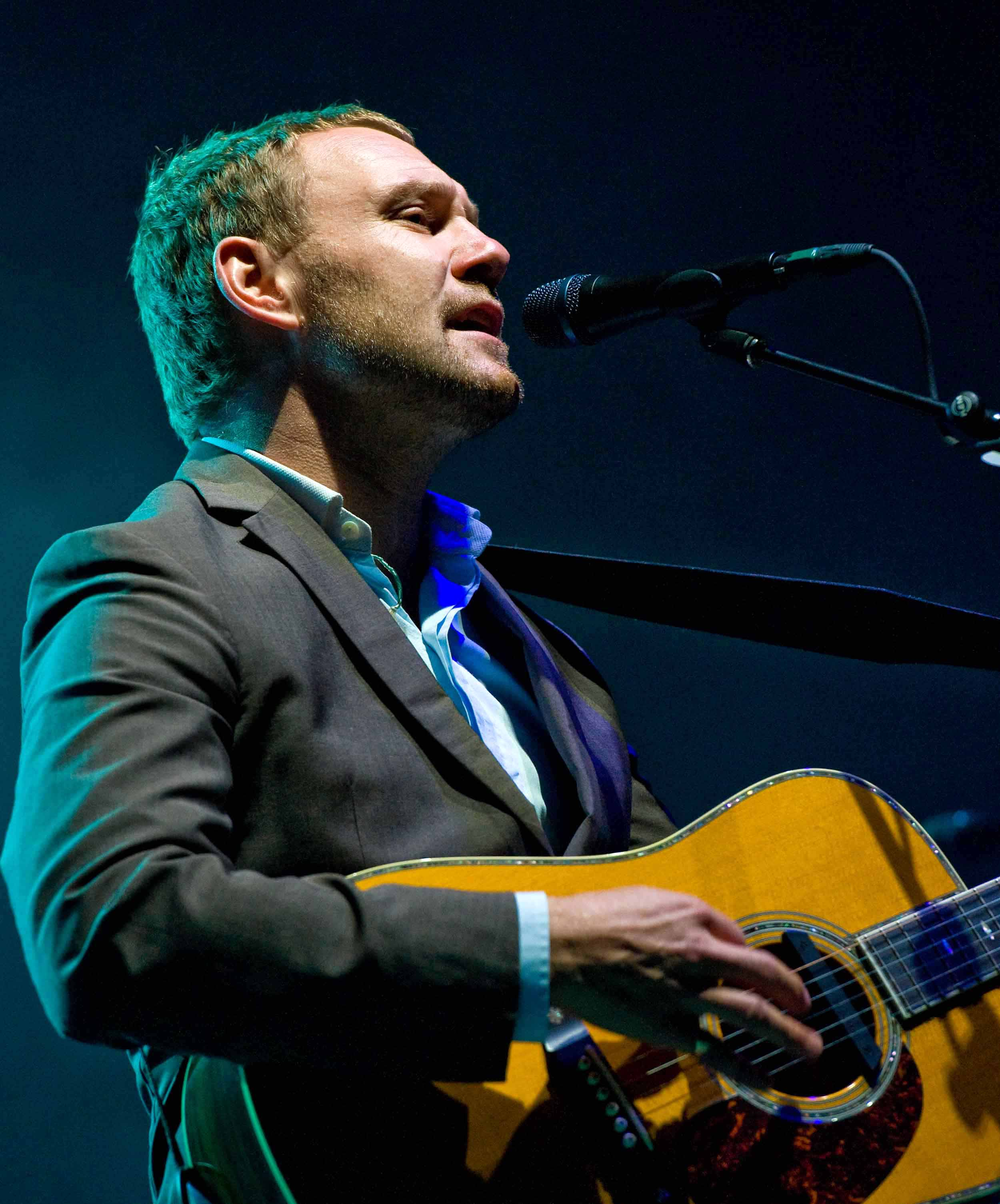
- Gray performing in Seattle, Washington in 2010
- Studio albums: 13
- Extended plays: 1
- Live albums: 1
- Compilation albums: 4
- Singles: 52
- Music videos: 19

The discography of David Gray, a British singer-songwriter, consists of 13 studio albums, two live albums, three compilation albums, an EP, and fifty-two singles.

Gray released three studio albums in the 1990s before finally making a commercial breakthrough with his fourth album White Ladder (1998), which received little initial attention before being re-released the following year. It has sold more than 3 million copies in the UK alone, making it one of the best-selling albums of all time there. He achieved two subsequent UK number-ones with A New Day at Midnight (2002) and Life in Slow Motion (2005), and went on to reach the US Top 20 with five successive albums.

== Albums ==
=== Studio albums ===
List of albums, with selected chart positions, and certifications
Title	Album details	Peak chart positions										Sales	Certifications
Title	Album details	UK	AUS	AUT	GER	IRE	NLD	NZ	NOR	SWI	US	Sales	Certifications
A Century Ends	Released: 12 April 1993; Label: Hut; Formats: CD, cassette	144	—	—	—	23	—	—	—	—	—		
Flesh	Released: 6 September 1994; Label: Hut; Formats: CD, cassette	152	—	—	—	70	—	—	—	—	—		
Sell, Sell, Sell	Released: 15 April 1996; Label: EMI; Formats: CD, cassette	92	—	—	—	36	—	—	—	—	—		BPI: Gold
White Ladder	Released: 8 March 1999; Label: IHT / EastWest; Formats: CD, cassette	1	34	—	61	1	51	4	18	—	35	UK: 3,017,085; IRE: 350,000; US: 2,400,000	BPI: 10× Platinum; ARIA: 2× Platinum; NVPI: Gold; RIAA: Platinum
Lost Songs 95–98	Released: 31 July 2000; Label: IHT; Formats: CD, cassette	7	—	—	—	1	—	—	—	—	153		BPI: Gold
A New Day at Midnight	Released: 28 October 2002; Label: IHT / EastWest; Formats: CD, cassette	1	22	—	61	1	81	6	29	45	17	UK: 1,213,117; US: 604,000	BPI: 4× Platinum; ARIA: Gold; RIAA: Gold; IRMA: 6× Platinum
Life in Slow Motion	Released: 12 September 2005; Label: IHT / Atlantic; Formats: CD, digital download	1	8	68	49	1	23	4	3	19	16	UK: 759,861; US: 414,000	BPI: 2× Platinum; ARIA: Gold; IRMA: 4× Platinum
Draw the Line	Released: 14 September 2009; Label: IHT / Polydor; Formats: CD, digital download	5	18	74	70	2	21	15	—	18	12		BPI: Gold; IRMA: Gold
Foundling	Released: 17 August 2010; Label: IHT / Polydor; Formats: CD, digital download	18	34	—	—	9	55	—	—	26	9		
Mutineers	Released: 17 June 2014; Label: IHT; Formats: CD, digital download, 12"	10	22	67	53	7	31	36	—	27	15		
Gold in a Brass Age	Released: 8 March 2019; Label: IHT; Formats: CD, digital download, 12"	21	71	—	—	37	—	—	—	45	186		
Skellig	Released: 19 February 2021; Label: Laugh A Minute; Formats: CD, digital download, 12"	53	—	—	—	22	—	—	—	—	—		
Dear Life	Released: 17 January 2025; Label: Laugh A Minute; Formats: CD, digital download	25	—	—	—	42	—	—	—	88	—		
"—" denotes album that did not chart or was not released

=== Live albums ===
Title	Album details
A Thousand Miles Behind	Released: 13 August 2007; Label: iht Records; Formats: CD, digital download
White Ladder Live	Released: 14 July 2024; Label: Laugh A Minute Records; Formats: digital download, 12"

=== Compilation albums ===
Title	Album details	Peak chart positions						Certifications
Title	Album details	UK	AUS	IRE	NZ	NOR	US	Certifications
The EPs 1992–1994	Released: 2 July 2001; Label: Hut; Formats: CD, cassette	68	—	18	—	—	—	
Shine: The Best of the Early Years	Released: 26 March 2007; Label: EMI; Formats: CD, digital download	—	—	—	—	—	—	
Greatest Hits	Released: 12 November 2007; Label: IHT / Atlantic; Formats: CD, digital download	11	61	7	15	38	96	BPI: Platinum; ARIA: Gold; RMNZ: Gold
The Best of David Gray	Released: 28 October 2016; Label: IHT Records; Formats: CD, digital download	30	91	51	—	—	—	BPI: Gold
"—" denotes album that did not chart or was not released

== Extended plays ==
Title	EP details
Live from London EP	Released: 3 April 2006; Label: IHT; Formats: digital download
Gold in a Brass Age (Ground Control Acoustic Sessions)	Released: 12 July 2019; Label: IHT; Formats: digital download

== Singles ==
List of singles, with selected chart position, showing year released and album name
Single	Year	Peak chart positions										Certifications	Album
Single	Year	UK	AUS	AUT	GER	IRE	NLD	NZ	SWI	US	US AAA	Certifications	Album
"Birds Without Wings"	1992	—	—	—	—	—	—	—	—	—	-		A Century Ends
"Shine"	1993	184	—	—	—	—	—	—	—	—	-		A Century Ends
"Wisdom"	1993	—	—	—	—	—	—	—	—	—	-		A Century Ends
"A Century Ends"	1993	—	—	—	—	—	—	—	—	—	-		A Century Ends
"What Are You?"	1994	—	—	—	—	—	—	—	—	—	-		Flesh
"Faster Sooner Now"	1996	—	—	—	—	—	—	—	—	—	-		Sell, Sell, Sell
"Late Night Radio"	1996	—	—	—	—	—	—	—	—	—	-		Sell, Sell, Sell
"This Year's Love"	1999	20	—	—	—	27	—	—	—	—	-	BPI: Platinum; RMNZ: 2× Platinum	White Ladder
"Babylon"	1999	5	51	—	96	31	81	31	—	57	1	BPI: Platinum; RMNZ: Platinum	White Ladder
"Please Forgive Me"	1999	18	186	—	—	46	—	—	—	—	10	BPI: Silver	White Ladder
"Sail Away"	2001	26	—	—	—	31	—	—	—	-	11	BPI: Platinum; RMNZ: Platinum	White Ladder
"Say Hello, Wave Goodbye"	2001	26	—	—	—	—	—	—	—	—	-		White Ladder
"Dead in the Water"	2002	—	—	—	—	—	—	—	—	—	-		A New Day at Midnight
"The Other Side"	2002	35	171	—	—	—	—	—	—	—	4		A New Day at Midnight
"Be Mine"	2003	23	133	—	—	36	—	—	—	—	6		A New Day at Midnight
"Caroline"	2003	—	—	—	—	—	—	—	—	—	-		A New Day at Midnight
"The One I Love"	2005	8	59	48	96	8	93	38	—	—	1	BPI: Silver; RMNZ: Gold	Life in Slow Motion
"Hospital Food"	2005	34	—	—	—	40	—	—	—	—	8		Life in Slow Motion
"Alibi"	2006	71	—	—	—	47	—	—	—	—	-		Life in Slow Motion
"You're the World to Me"	2007	53	—	—	—	48	—	—	—	—	1		Greatest Hits
"Fugitive"	2009	103	199	—	—	32	—	—	84	—	1		Draw the Line
"Full Steam" (featuring Annie Lennox)	2009	—	—	—	—	—	—	—	—	—	-		Draw the Line
"Stella the Artist"	2009	—	—	—	—	—	—	—	—	—	8		Draw the Line
"Draw the Line"	2010	—	—	—	—	—	—	—	—	—	-		Draw the Line
"A Moment Changes Everything"	2010	—	—	—	—	—	—	—	—	—	6		Foundling
"Only the Wine"	2010	—	—	—	—	—	—	—	—	—	19		Foundling
"Indeed I Will"	2011	—	—	—	—	—	—	—	—	—	-		Foundling
"Money (That's What I Want)"	2012	—	—	—	—	—	—	—	—	—	-		
"Gulls"	2014	—	—	—	—	—	—	—	—	—	-		Mutineers
"Back in the World"	2014	—	—	—	—	—	—	—	—	—	11		Mutineers
"Beautiful Agony"	2014	—	—	—	—	—	—	—	—	—	-		Mutineers
"Birds of the High Arctic"	2014	—	—	—	—	—	—	—	—	—	-		Mutineers
"Snow in Vegas" (featuring LeAnn Rimes)	2015	—	—	—	—	—	—	—	—	—	-		Mutineers
"Smoke Without Fire"	2016	—	—	—	—	—	—	—	—	—	-		The Best of David Gray
"Enter Lightly"	2016	—	—	—	—	—	—	—	—	—	-		The Best of David Gray
"An Eclipse"	2017	—	—	—	—	—	—	—	—	—	-		
"Hole in the Weather"	2017	—	—	—	—	—	—	—	—	—	-		
"The Sapling"	2018	—	—	—	—	—	—	—	—	—	-		Gold in a Brass Age
"A Tight Ship"	2019	—	—	—	—	—	—	—	—	—	29		Gold in a Brass Age
"Watching The Waves"	2019	—	—	—	—	—	—	—	—	—	-		Gold in a Brass Age
"If 8 Were 9"	2019	—	—	—	—	—	—	—	—	—	-		Gold in a Brass Age
"Mallory" (Acoustic)	2019	—	—	—	—	—	—	—	—	—	-		Gold in a Brass Age (Ground Control Acoustic Sessions)
"Gold in a Brass Age" (Acoustic)	2019	—	—	—	—	—	—	—	—	—	-		Gold in a Brass Age (Ground Control Acoustic Sessions)
"Over My Head"	2019	—	—	—	—	—	—	—	—	—	-		White Ladder (20th Anniversary Edition)
"Through to Myself"	2019	—	—	—	—	—	—	—	—	—	-		White Ladder (20th Anniversary Edition)
"Skellig"	2020	—	—	—	—	—	—	—	—	—	-		Skellig
"Heart and Soul"	2021	—	—	—	—	—	—	—	—	—	-		Skellig
"The Arc"	2022	—	—	—	—	—	—	—	—	—	-		Simmerdim: Curlew Sounds
"Right By Your Side" (Betty Boo featuring David Gray)	2022	—	—	—	—	—	—	—	—	—	-		Boomerang
"Plus & Minus"	2024	—	—	—	—	—	—	—	—	—	30		Dear Life
"After the Harvest"	2024	—	—	—	—	—	—	—	—	—	-		Dear Life
"Singing for the Pharaoh"	2024	—	—	—	—	—	—	—	—	—	-		Dear Life
"—" denotes single that did not chart or was not released

== Video albums ==
Title	Details	Certification
David Gray: Live	Released: 2000; Label: Warner Music Vision	ARIA: Platinum
Live in Slow Motion	Released: April 2006; Label: Warner Music Vision	ARIA: Gold
Live from the Artists Den	Released: 2015; Label: Artists Den Records	

== Music videos ==
Year	Video	Director
1992	"Birds Without Wings"	
1993	"Shine"	Tony van den Ende
1993	"Wisdom"	Lindy Heymann
1996	"Late Night Radio"	Donal Scannell and Donal Dineen
1998	"This Year's Love" (version 1)	
2000	"Babylon" (UK version)	Kieran Evans
2000	"Babylon" (US version)	Mike Figgis
2000	"Please Forgive Me" (UK version)	Kieran Evans and Russell Thomas
2000	"Please Forgive Me" (US version)	David Kellogg
2001	"This Year's Love" (version 2)	David Slade
2001	"Sail Away"	Big TV!
2002	"The Other Side"	Big TV!
2003	"Be Mine"	Vaughan Arnell
2005	"The One I Love"	Motion Theory
2005	"Hospital Food"	Rainbows & Vampires
2005	"Alibi"	Happy
2009	"Fugitive"	Will Barras and Dan Lumb
2009	"Full Steam"	Andy Morahan
2014	"Gulls"	Donal Dineen and Myles O'Reilly
2014	"Back in the World"	
2014	"Beautiful Agony"	
2016	"Smoke Without Fire"	
