= Greatest Hits (David Gray album) =

Greatest hits album by David Gray
- Released: 12 November 2007
- Recorded: 1993–2007
- Genre: Rock
- Length: 59:45
- Label: Atlantic (UK); ATO Records, IHT (US)
- Producer: David Gray, Iestyn Polson, Craig McClune, Marius de Vries, Chris Thomas

David Gray chronology
A Thousand Miles Behind (2007)	Greatest Hits (2007)	Draw the Line (2009)

Professional ratings
Review scores
Source	Rating
AllMusic	3.5/5 stars
BBC.co.uk	(neutral)
IndieLondon	4/5 stars
In the News	(6/10)
Manchester Evening News	3/5 stars
Starpulse.com	3.5/5 stars

Greatest Hits is a compilation album by English singer-songwriter David Gray, released on 12 November 2007 in the UK and a day later in the US. Greatest Hits contains songs from his first album, A Century Ends in 1993, through to his 2005 album Life in Slow Motion, and includes two new songs: the first single "You're the World to Me" and "Destroyer". In interviews, Gray has described the new single "You're the World to Me" as "joyous" and "unselfconscious", and called his Greatest Hits album "a bag of happy shit".

All tracks are the original album versions, with the exception of "Be Mine" which features the single remix; "Babylon," which includes a new mix; and "Shine." Due to record company issues, the original recording of "Shine" could not be used, and instead, a live recording from Gray's concert DVD Live in Slow Motion is featured on the compilation.

The Japanese pressing of the CD contains two bonus tracks, while Barnes & Noble released an exclusive version with a bonus disc containing two rare live covers – "One With the Birds" by Will Oldham and "Morning of My Life" by the Bee Gees (retitled "In the Morning"), previously only available as a digital download from the compilation album A Thousand Miles Behind (2007).

As of November 2016, the album has sold 353,936 copies in the UK.

== Track listing ==
No.	Title	Writer(s)	Length
1.	"You're the World to Me"	Gray	3:37
2.	"Babylon" (New Remix)	Gray	3:38
3.	"The One I Love"	Gray, McClune	3:29
4.	"Please Forgive Me"	Gray	5:35
5.	"Be Mine" (Single Remix)	Gray, McClune	3:52
6.	"Hospital Food"	Gray, Malone	4:44
7.	"This Year's Love"	Gray	4:05
8.	"Alibi"	Gray	4:34
9.	"Sail Away"	Gray	5:15
10.	"Shine" (Live at the Hammersmith Apollo)	Gray	4:42
11.	"Caroline"	Gray	3:39
12.	"The Other Side"	Gray	4:29
13.	"Flame Turns Blue"	Gray	4:51
14.	"Destroyer"	Gray	3:18

Japan-only bonus tracks
No.	Title	Writer(s)	Length
15.	"Dead in the Water"	Gray	3:07
16.	"Falling Down the Mountainside"	Gray	4:50

Barnes & Noble exclusive bonus disc
No.	Title	Writer(s)	Length
1.	"One with the Birds"	Oldham	5:24
2.	"In the Morning"	Gibb	3:10

== Charts ==
=== Weekly charts ===
Weekly chart performance for Greatest Hits
Chart (2007)	Peak position
Australian (ARIA Charts)	61
Irish Albums (IRMA)	7
New Zealand Albums (RMNZ)	15
Norwegian Albums (VG-lista)	38
Scottish Albums (OCC)	8
UK Albums (OCC)	11

=== Year-end charts ===
Annual chart performance for Greatest Hits
Chart (2007)	Position
UK Albums (OCC)	86

== Certifications and sales ==
Certification and sales figures for Greatest Hits
Region	Certification	Certified units/sales
Australia (ARIA)	Gold	35,000^{^}
New Zealand (RMNZ)	Gold	7,500^{^}
United Kingdom (BPI)	Platinum	353,936
^{^} Shipments figures based on certification alone.
