= Lakou Mizik =

Haitian band

- Origin: Haiti
- Label: Cumbancha
- Website: lakoumizik.com

Lakou Mizik are a Haitian band. They formed following the 2010 Haiti earthquake, and have released three albums.

== History ==
Nine Haitian musicians formed Lakou Mizik following the 2010 Haiti earthquake. They are managed by Zach Niles, who also managed Sierra Leone's Refugee All Stars.

Lakou Mizik's debut album Wa Di Yo was released in 2016 on Cumbancha. It was produced by Iestyn Polson and Chris Velan, and featured vocals from Haitian musician Boulo Valcourt. Songlines described Wa Di Yo as "roots revival music at its most joyous and vital". Lakou Mizik toured the album internationally, which included a performance at the New Orleans Jazz & Heritage Festival.

In 2019, Lakou Mizik released their second album HaitiaNola on Cumbancha. The album was partly recorded in New Orleans, USA, and partly in Haiti. It was produced by Eric Heigle. Several musicians from New Orleans festure on the album, including the Preservation Hall Jazz Band, Trombone Shorty, Tarriona "Tank" Ball, and Leyla McCalla. In 2021, Lakou Mizik released Leave the Bones on Anjunadeep, a collaborative album with electronic musician Joseph Ray of Nero.

== Albums ==
- Wa Di Yo (2016)
- HaitiaNola (2019)
- Leave the Bones (2021), with Joseph Ray of Nero
