= Draw the Line (David Gray album) =

Studio album by David Gray
- Released: 14 September 2009
- Recorded: May 2008–May 2009
- Studio: The Church Studios
- Genre: Folk rock
- Length: 46:55
- Label: Mercer Street/iht
- Producers: David Gray; Iestyn Polson; Rob Malone

David Gray chronology
Greatest Hits (2007)	Draw the Line (2009)	Foundling (2010)

Singles from Draw the Line
- 1. "Fugitive" Released: 7 September 2009; 2. "Full Steam" Released: 28 December 2009

Professional ratings
Aggregate scores
Source	Rating
Metacritic	62/100
Review scores
Source	Rating
AllMusic	3/5 stars
BBC	(favourable)
The Guardian	3/5 stars
The Independent	2/5 stars
Planet Sound	5/10
Slant	3/5 stars
The Telegraph	4/5 stars

Draw the Line is the eighth studio album by English singer-songwriter David Gray, released on 14 September 2009 in Europe and 22 September in the United States. The first single "Fugitive" was released on 7 September 2009. The second single, a duet with Annie Lennox, "Full Steam", released on 28 December 2009.

== Album information ==
Gray recorded the album, his first set of new songs since 2005's Life in Slow Motion, in his own studio—The Church Studios—while unsigned to a record label. The studio previously belonged to the Eurythmics, and when Gray invited Annie Lennox to guest-record the duet "Full Steam," she reprimanded him for not changing the carpets. The track, described as "a broad political thing," is one of two duets on the album. The second, "Kathleen," features Jolie Holland. Gray revealed in an interview that the original choice for "Kathleen" was Dolly Parton, to whom he wrote a letter with a demo of the song. Parton turned down the offer, as she was busy.

Draw the Line is the first studio album after Gray parted with longtime collaborator Craig McClune in 2007. Gray said that he felt "the creative spark was sort of diminishing between the people who were involved." The album includes 11 new songs, with a new band: Neill MacColl on guitar (brother of Kirsty MacColl and who had played on Gray's first two albums), Robbie Malone on bass and Keith Prior on drums. Gray told The Irish Times that these changes were part of the thinking behind the title: "It's the end of one thing and the start of another. Because there was a chapter and it's ended and now there's a new one. But also it's like, 'don't cross this line!' It's confrontational, which is intentional. That's how I feel."

A deluxe hardcover book edition of the album, featuring a booklet with 20 pages of illustrations and a bonus CD of tracks recorded live at The Roundhouse, was also released simultaneously.

== Commercial performance ==
Draw the Line entered and peaked on the UK Album Chart at number five and charted for only five weeks, making it Gray's poorest performing release since The EPs 1992–1994 which charted for only one week. In Austria, it entered and peaked at number 74, charting for only one week.

In the United States, the album performed better on the Independent Albums chart, peaking at number 2 and charting for 20 weeks. The album also did better on the Swiss Music Charts, peaking at number 18 and charting for four weeks. Draw the Line also made it into the top 20 in other charts such as the ARIA Charts, peaking at number 18 and charting for 7 weeks. It also did well in New Zealand, peaking at number 15 and charting for 3 weeks.

== Track listing ==
Draw the Line track listing
No.	Title	Writer(s)	Length
1.	"Fugitive"	Gray, Malone, Prior	3:43
2.	"Draw the Line"	Gray, Malone, MacColl	4:23
3.	"Nemesis"	Gray, Malone, MacColl	5:26
4.	"Jackdaw"	Gray	3:54
5.	"Kathleen" (featuring Jolie Holland)	Gray	3:49
6.	"First Chance"	Gray, Prior	6:00
7.	"Harder"	Gray, Malone, MacColl, Prior	3:51
8.	"Transformation"	Gray	3:23
9.	"Stella the Artist"	Gray, Malone, Prior	3:37
10.	"Breathe"	Gray	4:39
11.	"Full Steam" (featuring Annie Lennox)	Gray	4:12
Total length:			46:55

iTunes-only bonus track
No.	Title	Writer(s)	Length
12.	"Second Halo"	Gray	4:08

Bonus disc
No.	Title	Writer(s)	Length
1.	"You're the World to Me" (Live at the London Roundhouse)	Gray	3:43
2.	"Sail Away" (Live at the London Roundhouse)	Gray	5:24
3.	"Ain't No Love" (Live at the London Roundhouse)	Gray	3:17
4.	"Babylon" (Live at the London Roundhouse)	Gray	6:29
5.	"Slow Motion" (Live at the London Roundhouse)	Gray, McClune	4:38
6.	"The One I Love" (Live at the London Roundhouse)	Gray, McClune	4:12
7.	"The Other Side" (Live at the London Roundhouse)	Gray	6:48
8.	"Nightblindness" (Live at the London Roundhouse)	Gray	11:09

== Personnel ==
- David Gray – vocals, piano, acoustic guitar, Wurlitzer, hi-strung, vox organ, vibraphone, harmonium
- Keith Prior – drums, percussion, b/v 's
- Rob Malone – bass, electric guitar, acoustic guitar, harmonium, b/v 's
- Neill Maccoll – electric guitar, acoustic guitar, mandolin, hi-strung, b/v 's
- Caroline Dale – cello
- Jolie Holland – vocals on track 5
- Annie Lennox – vocals on track 11
- Iestyn Polson – programming
- Simon Changer – mix engineer

== Charts ==
Chart performance for Draw the Line
Chart (2009)	Peak position
Australian Albums (ARIA)	18
Austrian Albums (Ö3 Austria)	74
Belgian Albums (Ultratop Flanders)	45
Dutch Albums (Album Top 100)	21
German Albums (Offizielle Top 100)	70
Irish Albums (IRMA)	2
Italian Albums (FIMI)	87
New Zealand Albums (RMNZ)	15
Swiss Albums (Schweizer Hitparade)	18
UK Albums (Official Charts)	5
US Billboard 200	12

== Certifications ==
Certifications for Draw the Line
Region	Certification	Certified units/sales
Ireland (IRMA)	Gold	7,500^{^}
United Kingdom (BPI) 2009 release	Silver	60,000^{^}
United Kingdom (BPI) 2015 release	Gold	100,000^{‡}
^{^} Shipments figures based on certification alone.^{‡} Sales+streaming figures based on certification alone.
