= Libation (album) =

Studio album by Sierra Leone's Refugee All Stars
- Released: March 18, 2014 US
- Recorded: Lane Gibson Recording & Mastering
- Genre: World, Reggae, Baskeda
- Label: Cumbancha
- Producer: Chris Velan

Sierra Leone's Refugee All Stars chronology
Radio Salone (2012)	Libation (2014)

Libation (2014) is the fourth album by Sierra Leone's Refugee All Stars, following Radio Salone (2012). It was produced by Canadian singer-songwriter Chris Velan, mixed by Iestyn Polson (known for his work with David Gray, Patti Smith, and David Bowie), and recorded at Lane Gibson Recording & Mastering in Charlotte, Vermont. The album celebrates the band's 10-year anniversary with a "return to roots, specifically the acoustic "around the campfire" vibe of their earliest recordings." Their sound combines elements of highlife, palm wine, maringa, baskeda and gumbe with modern dubstep and reggae.

== Track listing ==
No.	Title	Length
1.	"Chaimra"	3:49
2.	"Can't Make Me Lonely"	3:28
3.	"It's So Sorry"	4:23
4.	"Gbaenyama"	4:38
5.	"Rich But Poor"	4:37
6.	"Ghana Baby"	3:04
7.	"Manjalagi"	4:18
8.	"Maria"	3:42
9.	"Money No Do"	3:57
10.	"Treat You Right"	4:10
11.	"Min Do Sin Tay"	3:47
12.	"No Feel Bad O"	3:45
