= A Moment Changes Everything =

Single by David Gray

from the album Foundling
- Released: 13 July 2010
- Recorded: 2008–2009
- Genre: Folk rock, pop rock
- Length: 3:28
- Label: Polydor
- Songwriter(s): David Gray
- Producer(s): David Gray

David Gray singles chronology
| "Full Steam" (2009) | "A Moment Changes Everything" (2010) |

Alternative cover
- promo single

"A Moment Changes Everything" is the first single taken from David Gray's ninth studio album Foundling. The song was at one point scheduled to be included on a re-release of Gray's previous album Draw the Line, together with other unreleased tracks from that album's sessions. Promotional singles of "A Moment Changes Everything" were released to radio stations with the text "brand new single A MOMENT released 31st May 2010, Re-Release of Draw The Line with bonus material 7th June 2010" on the sleeve. The re-release was eventually withdrawn in favour of a brand new studio album, with "A Moment Changes Everything" being released as the lead single.

The song in its full length version was added to the Music Player on David Gray's website in mid-June.

Gray says of the song:

"I don't have fond feelings for it," Gray confesses. "I was contacted about doing some music for a [soccer] tournament a few years ago, and this was my stab on it based on the brief I was given. Unfortunately it got used on the telly and then people heard of it, and when anybody thinks there's any chance of a hit record at radio they just won't let go of the damn thing. So it got let out of the cupboard, and it's ended up on this bonus disc...It's just one of those throwaway moments that other people seize upon. But it doesn't really fit with 'Foundling,' which is very much where my heart lies."

== Track listing ==
Promo Single [cat# GRAY4]

1. "A Moment Changes Everything" (Album Version)
2. "A Moment Changes Everything" (Instrumental Version)

Single Release

1. "A Moment Changes Everything" – 3:28
