= Sell Sell Sell =

Sell Sell Sell may refer to:

- a song by the band Barenaked Ladies, on the album Maroon
- Sell, Sell, Sell, an album by David Gray, also the name of a song on the album
