= Living Like a Refugee =

Studio album / field recordings by Sierra Leone's Refugee All Stars
- Released: September 25, 2006 Europe and September 26, 2006 US
- Recorded: Guinea and Sam Jones' Island Studios Sierra Leone
- Producer: Chris Velan

Sierra Leone's Refugee All Stars chronology
Living Like a Refugee (2006)	Rise & Shine (2010)

Living Like a Refugee is the debut album from Sierra Leonian band Sierra Leone's Refugee All Stars, released in the Europe on 25 September 2006 and in the United States on 26 September 2006.

== Background ==
Sierra Leone and Freetown in particular has a rich musical history with a vibrant live scene still active start of the 1990s before the start of the Sierra Leone Civil War. Reuben Koroma, the main writer on the album, was a professional musician in Sierra Leone, his band The Emperors regularly played around Freetown. In 1997 the violence of the Civil War forced Koroma to flee to neighboring Guinea where he lived in a UN refugee camps.

== Recording and production ==
The tracks on the album were recorded over a number of years with the help of the crew of the documentary Sierra Leone's Refugee All Stars. The earliest tracks, Living Like A Refugee and Ma Fo Ya, were recorded live in refugee camps in Guinea by Banker White and Zach Niles while they were making a documentary about music in refugee camps. Living Like A Refugee was recorded at Sembakounya refugee camp as the band "played by the light of an oil lamp". The others were recorded in 2003 and 2004 at Sam Jones' Island Studios in Freetown. The album was produced by Chris Velan who was musical director for the film Sierra Leone's Refugee All Stars.

== Musical style, writing, composition ==
The songs on the album fall into a number of different music styles, with some songs a fusion of more than one style. The music on the album has been described as having a reggae style but others have said this is incorrect and as Sierra Leone's baskeda music has a feel close to reggae, which the bands writer has commented about. Writing in The Independent Andy Morgan describes this similarity as:

The music . . . sounds to the uneducated ear like classic Studio One reggae, a defiantly warm and good-humoured African throwback to the gorgeous harmony vocals and lilting backbeat of The Heptones, Burning Spear or Carlton and the Shores. But stylistic boundaries and lineages have long been blurred by the criss-crossing migrations of people and cultures across the Atlantic, and what sounds like reggae is in fact an age-old West-African rhythm called baskeda".

"Baskeda... that's my father's music, I used to love it when I was a kid so when I grew up I just tried to compose songs in that rhythm."

— Reuben Koroma

Other styles evident in the album include palm-wine and gumbe. The track Kele Mani "is lively gumbe, animated by bottle and hand-drum percussion and an ancient-sounding acoustic guitar." The influence of traditional West African music is present, for example gbute vange a style of music of Mende people in the track Pat Malonthone. These styles are overlaid on a baskeda rhythm and given a modern feel with the use of electric guitars and drums.

The lyrics of the album's songs speak of the pain and horror experienced during the Sierra Leone Civil War and the displacement and uncertainty of life as a refugee but the lyrics also talk about hope, peace and love. Track 3 Weapon Conflict incorporates the African proverb "When two elephants are fighting, the grass dem' a-suffer." as its lyrics speak out against the suffering of civilians caught up in war. The lyrics to Soda Soap draw directly on experience as a refugee in the camps of Guinea. Soda soap is the home made soap that people were using during wartime; the song prompts people to respect what they can make themselves. The last song on the album is Ma Fo Ya a traditional song of blessing, about the song Mohamed Bangura says: "I am calling out to my friends to see if they are all safe."

== Release and promotion ==
The album was originally only sold independently, sold through the Sierra Leone's Refugee All Stars film's website and at film festivals screening the film. All the money from these sales were sent back to the band in Sierra Leone. The film's producers, Niles and White, also produced cassette tapes of the album for distribution by the band in Sierra Leone.

== Critical reception ==
Living Like A Refugee is described as an internationally acclaimed album.

Professional ratings
Review scores
Source	Rating
Allmusic	4/5 stars
Billboard	(favorable)
The Guardian	4/5 stars
ABC	3.5/5 stars

== Track list ==
No.	Title	Writer(s)	Length
1.	"Living Like A Refugee"	Reuben M. Koroma	3:47
2.	"Soda Soap"	Reuben M. Koroma	4:30
3.	"Weapon Conflict"	Reuben M. Koroma	4:00
4.	"Bull to the Weak"	Reuben M. Koroma	4:20
5.	"Big Lesson"	Reuben M. Koroma	3:26
6.	"Let We Do We Own"	Ashade Pearce	5:07
7.	"Smile"	Reuben M. Koroma	4:59
8.	"Compliments for the Peace"	Reuben M. Koroma	4:17
9.	"Pat Malonthone"	Reuben M. Koroma	5:14
10.	"Garbage to the Showglass"	Reuben M. Koroma	4:12
11.	"Akera Ka Abonshor"	Reuben M. Koroma	4:52
12.	"Kele Mani"	Reuben M. Koroma	4:31
13.	"I'm Not A Fool"	Ashade Pearce	4:26
14.	"Ya N'Digba"	Reuben M. Koroma	4:34
15.	"Refugee Rolling"	Reuben M. Koroma	3:47
16.	"Monkey Work"	Reuben M. Koroma	4:06
17.	"Ma Fo Ya"	Traditional arranged by Reuben M. Koroma	2:50

== Personnel ==
Sierra Leone's Refugee All Stars

- Reuben M. Koroma – Band Leader, lead vocals
- Francis John Langba (Franco) – rhythm guitar, kongroma, vocals
- Abdul Rahim Kamara (Arahim) – vocals, percussion
- Efuah Grace – vocals
- Alhaji Jeffrey Kamara (Black Nature) – rap, vocals
- Mohamed Bangura (Medo) – vocals, percussion, kongroma
- Ashade Pearce – lead guitar, vocals
- Mustapha Massaquoi (Nico) – drums, percussion
- Idrissa Malam Bangura – bass guitar
- Geassay Jah Sun Dowu Bull – lead guitar, percussion
- Mohammed Makengo Kamara – vocals, percussion

Additional Musicians

- Andrew (Jah Open the Door) Mamania – vocals, percussion
- Abdul Bean – rhythm guitar
- Chris Velan – bass guitar, guitar, keyboards, vocals, percussion
- Mohammed (Funky) Bangura – bass guitar
- Mohammed Bedo Kamara – drums
- Frank Hallowei – keyboards

Technical

- EJ Holowicki – field recording mixing (tracks 1, 17)
- Chris Velan – production
- Daniel Cinelli – mastering, mixing and additional overdubs
- Ghislain Brind'Amour – assistant engineer

== Charts ==
Chart (2006)	Peak position
US Billboard Reggae Albums	8
US Billboard World Albums	15
