= Wisdom (song) =

Single by David Gray

from the album A Century Ends
- Released: 14 June 1993
- Genre: Folk rock
- Length: 4:15
- Label: Hut/Virgin
- Songwriter(s): David Gray
- Producer(s): David Anderson

David Gray singles chronology
"Shine" (1993)	"Wisdom" (1993)	"This Year's Love" (1999)

"Wisdom" was the third single released by David Gray, released on 14 June 1993, and taken from his debut album A Century Ends. The single and its B-sides were later included on the 2001 compilation The EPs 1992–1994.

== Track listing ==
1. "Wisdom" – 4:15
2. "Lovers" – 3:22
3. "4AM" – 2:42
