= List of compact discs sold with MediaMax =

The following compact discs were sold with a software package for copy-protection known as MediaMax, created by SunnComm. Discs with MediaMax were sold in USA, Canada, and Mexico, mostly used by sub-labels of Sony BMG including RCA Records, Arista Records, and Jive Records.

| Title | Artist |
|---|---|
| Afterglow Live [US release with DVD] | Sarah McLachlan |
| All That I Am | Santana |
| Bloom: Remix Album | Sarah McLachlan |
| Chapter 3: The Flesh | Syleena Johnson |
| Charlie, Last Name Wilson | Charlie Wilson |
| Chris Brown | Chris Brown |
| The Clarence Greenwood Recordings | Citizen Cope |
| Contraband | Velvet Revolver |
| Cook, Dixon & Young: Volume One | Cook, Dixon & Young |
| Dido Live | Dido |
| Elizabethtown: Songs from the Brown Hotel EP | various artists |
| Everybody Know Me | YoungBloodZ |
| Defined (album) | Amici Forever |
| Forever Faithless – The Greatest Hits | Faithless |
| Grown & Sexy | Babyface |
| Harmonies for the Haunted | stellastarr* |
| Howl | Black Rebel Motorcycle Club |
| I'm a Hustla | Cassidy |
| In Your Honor | Foo Fighters |
| Kasabian | Kasabian |
| Life in Slow Motion | David Gray |
| Live – Friday the 13th | Maroon 5 |
| The Love Experience | Raheem DeVaughn |
| Masters of Horror | various artists |
| Merry Christmas with Love | Clay Aiken |
| Never Gone | Backstreet Boys |
| Rappa Ternt Sanga | T-Pain |
| Sixty Six Steps | Leo Kottke and Mike Gordon |
| So Amazing: An All-Star Tribute to Luther Vandross | various artists |
| Speak for Yourself | Imogen Heap |
| Stand Up [RCA/BMG catalog # 82876 68796-2] | Dave Matthews Band |
| Stone Love | Angie Stone |
| Subjects | Judd & Maggie |
| Three Chord Country and American Rock & Roll | Keith Anderson |
| Unplugged | Alicia Keys |
| Which Side Are You On? | Wakefield |
| Z | My Morning Jacket |
