= Full Steam =

Single by David Gray featuring Annie Lennox

from the album Draw the Line
- Released: 15 November 2009
- Recorded: 2008
- Studio: The Church Studios (London, England)
- Genre: Folk rock; pop rock
- Length: 4:12
- Label: Polydor
- Songwriter: David Gray
- Producer: David Gray

David Gray singles chronology
"Fugitive" (2009)	"Full Steam" (2009)	"A Moment Changes Everything" (2010)

Annie Lennox singles chronology
"Pattern of My Life" (2009)	"Full Steam" (2009)	"Universal Child" (2010)

Music video
- "Full Steam" on YouTube

Back cover

"Full Steam" is the second single taken from David Gray's eighth studio album Draw the Line. The song is a duet between Gray and Annie Lennox. It was issued as a promo CD single on 19 October 2009. Originally planned to be officially released as a single on 23 November 2009, the single was delayed to 28 December 2009, although no singles were released on that date. A music video featuring Gray and Lennox was filmed for the song, and it remained a download single with all proceeds from the sale of the single going to Children in Need.

Gray and Lennox performed the song on Later... with Jools Holland to promote its single release. The music video for the song premiered when it was uploaded on Annie Lennox's Official YouTube channel on 19 November 2009.

== Track listing ==
CD single promo (Polydor, UMG – cat# GRAY3)

1. "Full Steam" (radio edit) – 3:49
2. "Full Steam" (instrumental) – 4:12

Download (Polydor, UMG)

1. "Full Steam" – 4:11
