= Rise & Shine (Sierra Leone's Refugee All Stars album) =

Studio album by Sierra Leone's Refugee All Stars
- Released: March 23, 2010 US
- Recorded: Freetown, Sierra Leone; New Orleans, Louisiana
- Label: Cumbancha
- Producer: Steve Berlin

Sierra Leone's Refugee All Stars chronology
Living Like a Refugee (2006)	Rise & Shine (2010)	Radio Salone (2012)

Rise & Shine (2010) is the second album by Sierra Leone's Refugee All Stars, following their debut album Living Like a Refugee (2006). The album was produced by Steve Berlin, renowned for his work with Los Lobos, Angélique Kidjo, Michelle Shocked, Rickie Lee Jones and Ozomatli, and recorded in their hometown of Freetown, Sierra Leone and New Orleans, Louisiana. Reflecting the influences of both recording locations, the album's sound is "a fusion of traditional West African music and roots reggae, inflected with New Orleans styles."

== Track listing ==
No.	Title	Length
1.	"Muloma (Let Us Be United)"	4:53
2.	"Global Threat"	5:12
3.	"Oruwieibe/Magazine Bobo Medley"	2:52
4.	"Living Stone"	3:16
5.	"Dununya (The World)"	3:16
6.	"Jah Mercy"	4:02
7.	"Tamagbondorsu (The Rich Mock The Poor)"	6:04
8.	"Bute Vange"	2:23
9.	"Jah Come Down"	5:21
10.	"Bend Down the Corner"	4:54
11.	"Goat Smoke Pipe"	2:49
12.	"Gbrr Mani (Trouble)"	4:40
13.	"Watching All Your Ways"	4:12
