= Shine: The Best of the Early Years =

Compilation album by David Gray
- Released: 26 March 2007
- Recorded: 1992–1996
- Genre: Folk rock
- Length: 65:08
- Label: EMI (UK); Astralwerks (US)
- Producer: David Gray, David Anderson

David Gray chronology
| Life in Slow Motion (2005) | Shine: The Best of the Early Years (2007) | A Thousand Miles Behind (2007) |

Professional ratings
Review scores
| Source | Rating |
|---|---|
| AllMusic | link |
| Q | 3/5 stars |
| Record Collector | link |

Shine: The Best of the Early Years is a compilation album by David Gray, released on 26 March 2007 in the UK and a day later in the US. The compilation contains tracks from Gray's first three albums and was released ahead of his Greatest Hits album, which followed in November.

== Track listing ==
All tracks are written by David Gray

| No. | Title | Length |
|---|---|---|
| 1. | "Shine" | 4:33 |
| 2. | "Late Night Radio" | 3:54 |
| 3. | "Coming Down" | 6:14 |
| 4. | "Birds Without Wings" | 4:49 |
| 5. | "The Light" | 4:10 |
| 6. | "Everytime" | 4:41 |
| 7. | "A Century Ends" | 5:05 |
| 8. | "Lullaby" | 3:38 |
| 9. | "Faster, Sooner, Now" | 2:23 |
| 10. | "Wisdom" | 4:11 |
| 11. | "Falling Free" | 3:24 |
| 12. | "Sell, Sell, Sell" | 5:10 |
| 13. | "Debauchery" | 3:24 |
| 14. | "Flesh" | 5:17 |
| 15. | "Hold on to Nothing" | 4:15 |
