= Sierra Leone's Refugee All Stars (film) =

- Film poster
- Directed by: Zach Niles; Banker White
- Written by: Jim Bruce; Zach Niles; Banker White
- Produced by: Steve Bing; Jim Bruce; Ice Cube; Shelley Lazar; Zach Niles; Banker White
- Cinematography: Chris Jenkins; Andy Mitchell; Banker White
- Edited by: Jim Bruce; Banker White
- Production companies: Shangri-La Entertainment; Cube Vision
- Release date: November 2005 (AFI Film Fest)
- Country: United States

Sierra Leone's Refugee All Stars is a documentary film about the musical band of the same name composed entirely of refugees from Freetown displaced to Guinea during the 1991-2002 civil war in Sierra Leone.

The film follows the band for three years as they are relocated between various refugee camps in Guinea, and concludes with their return to Freetown and the recording of their first studio album, Living Like a Refugee.

It originally premiered in November 2005 in Los Angeles at the American Film Institute's Film Fest, winning the Grand Jury Prize for best documentary. It was later shown on the American PBS television show POV in June 2007.

== Synopsis ==
The band's leader, Reuben Koroma, and his wife Grace fled the violence in Sierra Leone, ending up in the Kalia refugee camp in Guinea. There they ran into Franco John Langba, a friend from the Freetown music scene. They began to make music together. Later, when they were transferred to the remote Sembakounya camp, they found three more musicians - Arahim ("Jah Voice"), Mohammed Bangura and Alhadji Jeffrey Kamara ("Black Nature") - and some instruments and equipment, and the band was formed. It was in this camp that they were discovered by the American filmmakers Zach Niles and Banker White, and Canadian singer-songwriter Chris Valen in August 2002. With the help of the United Nations Refugee Agency, they were preparing to tour the other refugee camps. Niles and White tagged along. Eventually, the band returned to Freetown to record their first album, Living Like a Refugee.

== Reception ==
Daniel Gold wrote in The New York Times of the POV airing, "The story told here is simple, and ultimately triumphant." Newsweek magazine's Vanessa Juarez praised its "compelling story".

== Home media ==
It was released on DVD for region 1 on 14 August 2007.
