= Radio Salone =

Studio album by Sierra Leone's Refugee All Stars
- Released: April 24, 2012 US
- Recorded: Brooklyn, Dunham Studios
- Genre: World, Reggae, Baskeda
- Label: Cumbancha
- Producer: Victor Axelrod

Sierra Leone's Refugee All Stars chronology
Rise & Shine (2010)	Radio Salone (2012)	Libation (album) (2014)

Radio Salone (2012) is the third album from Sierra Leone's Refugee All Stars. It was produced by artist and producer Victor Axelrod aka "Ticklah," who has worked with Sharon Jones & The Dap-Kings, Amy Winehouse and the Easy Star All Stars, and recorded at Dunham Studios in Brooklyn, NY.

With two records in their pockets, Sierra Leone's Refugee All Stars blend the vibrant sounds of traditional West Africa, along with all the grooves they have picked up throughout their travels since their formation in the Guinean Sembakounya Refugee Camp. The title, "Salone" stands for Sierra Leone in Krio shorthand, and is combined with "Radio" to acknowledge the important role of radios as a connection to the outside world during the civil war.

== Track listing ==
No.	Title	Length
1.	"Chant It Down"	1:21
2.	"Gbara Case"	6:06
3.	"Mother In Law"	5:16
4.	"Goombay Interlude-Rain Come Sun Come"	2:04
5.	"Reggae Sounds The Message"	3:43
6.	"Mampama"	4:07
7.	"Kali"	7:04
8.	"Goombay Interlude- Papa Franco"	2:15
9.	"Man Muyu"	7:50
10.	"Toman Teti M’Ba Akala - (How Would They Know That You Have Money?)"	5:36
11.	"Big Fat Dog"	3:01
12.	"Goombay Interlude- Shake Your Body"	0:56
13.	"Yesu Gorbu"	4:42
14.	"Work It Brighter"	5:19
15.	"Remake The World Again"	4:21
16.	"Goombay Interlude - A’Salamaleichem"	1:04
