= Sierra Leone's Refugee All Stars =

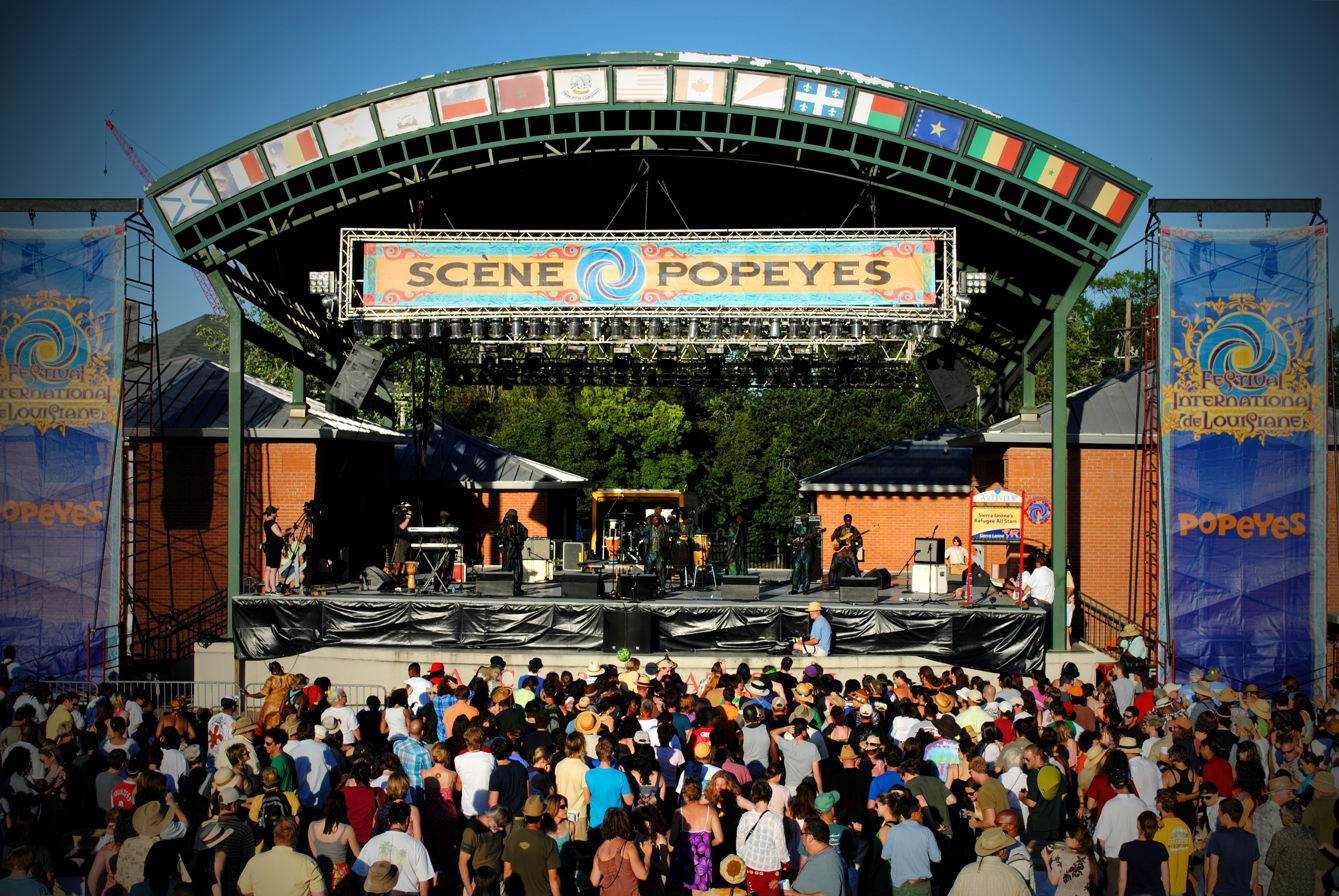
- Sierra Leone's Refugee All Stars playing at the Festival International de Louisiane

Background information
- Origin: Sierra Leone
- Genres: Baskeda, World, African
- Years active: 2002–present
- Label: Cumbancha
- Website: www.sierraleonesrefugeeallstars.com

Sierra Leone's Refugee All Stars (also called Refugee All Stars) is a band from Sierra Leone which was formed by a group of refugees displaced to Guinea during the Sierra Leone Civil War. Since their return to Freetown in 2004, the band has toured extensively to raise awareness for humanitarian causes. Their story is documented in the 2005 documentary film Sierra Leone's Refugee All Stars.

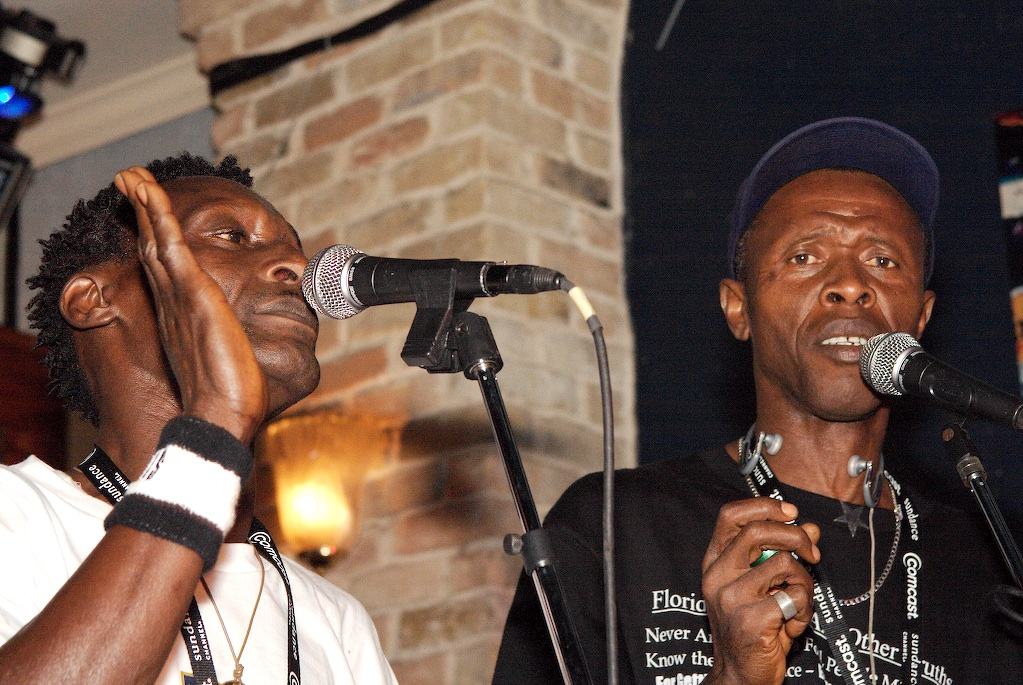
Performing at SXSW in 2006

Their debut album, Living Like a Refugee, was released on the label Anti in Europe on 25 September 2006, and in the US on September, 26 2006. Sierra Leone's Refugee All Stars' second studio album, Rise & Shine, was released 23 March 2010 by Cumbancha, and earned 2010 Album of the Year on the World Music Charts Europe. The album was produced by Steve Berlin of Los Lobos, recorded at Piety Street Studio in New Orleans and features local guest musicians Trombone Shorty, Washboard Chaz, and Bonerama.

The band's third studio album, Radio Salone, was released on 24 April 2012, by Cumbancha. The album was produced by Victor Axelrod, aka Ticklah and recorded at Dunham Studios in Brooklyn, NY. Marking the band's 10th anniversary, their most recent album Libation was released on 18 March 2014. It features elements of highlife and reggae as well as Afro-Latin rhythms. The album was recorded at Lane Gibson Recording & Mastering, produced by Chris Velan, and mixed by Iestyn Polson.

The band is formed of musicians Reuben M. Koroma (vocals), Ashade Pearce (vocals, rhythm guitar), Jahson Gbassay Bull (keyboard, organ, rhythm guitar), Alhaji Jeffrey Kamara aka Black Nature (rap, vocals, percussion), Mohamed Kamara aka Makengo (vocals, percussion), Augustine Kobina Valcarcel (lead guitar), Dennis Bakarr Sannoh (bass guitar, vocals), and Christopher Wagbay Davies (drum kit, percussion).

== History ==
In the early years of the civil war, Freetown remained on the outskirts of the most violent areas, but was attacked by rebels in the late 1990s. Among those who fled the country were musicians Reuben Koroma, his wife Grace, and Franco (Francis Langba), friends from the Freetown music scene who reconnected in the Kalia Refugee Camp in Guinea. There they began making music before being transferred to the remote Sembakounya Refugee Camp, where Arahim (Abdul Rahim Kamara), Mohammed Bangura, and Alhadji Jeffrey Kamara ("Black Nature") joined the band. A Canadian relief agency supplied the group with two old electric guitars, a microphone, and a basic sound system.

One day in August 2002, American documentary filmmakers Zach Niles and Banker White, and Canadian singer-songwriter Chris Velan encountered the group during rehearsal. They had been searching nearby refugee camps in Guinea for stories like the Sierra Leone's Refugee All Stars, which could "balance the Western media's focus on the region's violence with a sense of African society's beauty and resilience." At the time, the band was preparing to embark on a tour of Guinean refugee camps with the help of the United Nations refugee agency. The filmmakers followed their tour for three years, recording their joyous receptions, the traumas they faced, and the production of their first album, Living Like a Refugee, back in Freetown.

== International recognition ==
The 2005 documentary film Sierra Leone's Refugee All Stars, their three albums, and U.S. tours helped expand their following, leading to performances at New York's Central Park SummerStage, Japan's Fuji Rock Festival and the Bonnaroo Music & Arts Festival. On 15 December 2006, they appeared on The Oprah Winfrey Show. The All Stars also contributed a song to the Blood Diamond film soundtrack, participated in the U2 tribute album in the Name of Love: Africa Celebrates U2, and earned praise and backing from Sir Paul McCartney, Keith Richards, Ice Cube (an executive producer for the band's documentary film), and Angelina Jolie. One of "the most surreal moments of their climb to fame" was their performance opening for Aerosmith in November 2006 at the Mohegan Sun Arena in Uncasville, Connecticut.

== Genre and musical style ==
Although Sierra Leone's Refugee All Stars' music has been described as having a reggae feel, it is more directly influenced by the baskeda folk music of Sierra Leone which "is close to reggae in sound and spirit."

Writing in The Independent, Andy Morgan describes this similarity as:

The music . . . sounds to the uneducated ear like classic Studio One reggae, a defiantly warm and good-humoured African throwback to the gorgeous harmony vocals and lilting backbeat of The Heptones, Burning Spear or Carlton and the Shores. But stylistic boundaries and lineages have long been blurred by the criss-crossing migrations of people and cultures across the Atlantic, and what sounds like reggae is in fact an age-old West-African rhythm called baskeda.

"Baskeda... that's my father's music, I used to love it when I was a kid so when I grew up I just tried to compose songs in that rhythm."

— Reuben Koroma

Other styles evident in their albums include the West African sounds of palm-wine (or maringa), gumbe, and gbute vange, a music of the Mende people. Much of their music features the modern sounds of electric guitars, bass, and drum kits, but in their most recent album Libation, their "unplugged" style is a "return in a way to the days in the refugee camps when the band had to make do with whatever instruments they could round up or make by hand, and do without amplification and electronics."

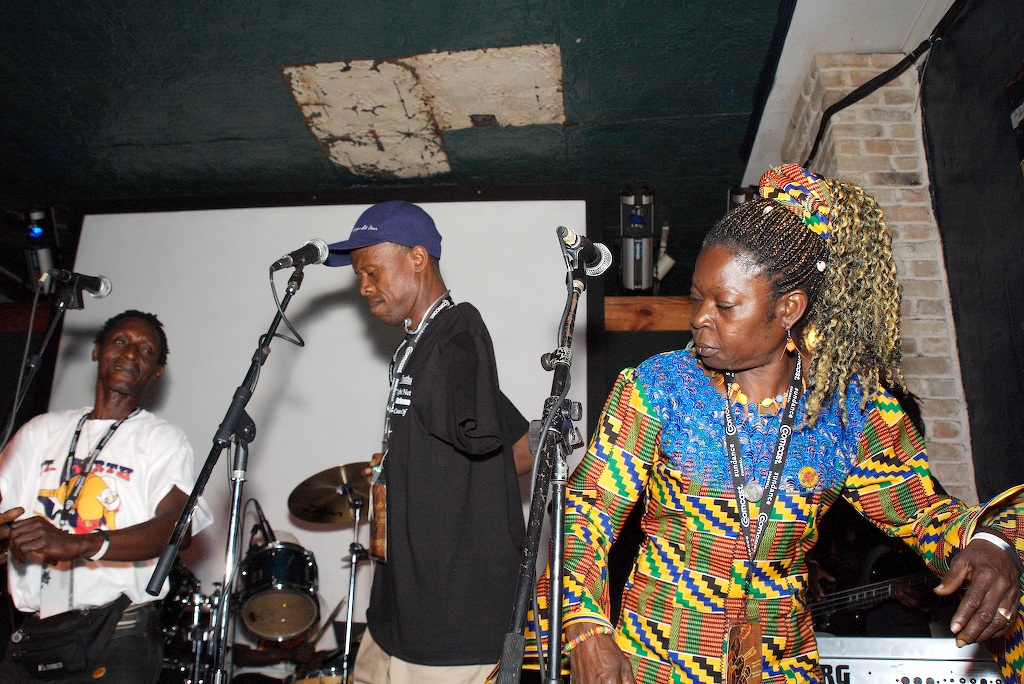
Performing at SXSW in 2006

== Discography ==
- Living Like a Refugee (2006)
- Rise & Shine (2010)
- Radio Salone (2012)
- Libation (2014)

== Filmography ==
- Sierra Leone's Refugee All Stars (2005)
