= Zach Niles =

American filmmaker and producer

- Born: Zach Niles; United States of America
- Education: Middlebury College
- Occupations: Director, producer, musician
- Years active: 1996–present

Zach Niles, is an American filmmaker and film producer. He is best known as the director and producer of the critically acclaimed film Sierra Leone's Refugee All Stars. Apart from acting, he is also a strategist, entertainment producer and a social justice advocate.

== Personal life ==
He is a graduate of Middlebury College. He has lived and worked in South Africa and Cameroon for a long period of time. During these years on African soil, he generated personal and professional interest in the music and culture of Africa. From 2011 until 2016, he lived in Haiti. He currently lives in Burlington, Vermont.

== Career ==
From 1998 to 2004, he was involved in music, and was part of the production and promotion of renowned rock music bands tours of The Rolling Stones, Paul McCartney, Madonna, and Simon and Garfunkel.

In 2000, he served as the associate producer for the eight-part television series, Live At The Fillmore, aired on the UPN Television Network. With the success of the television series, he turned to filmmaking. In 2005, he became the producer, director and writer for the film Sierra Leone's Refugee All Stars along with Banker White. The film rotates about the Sierra Leone's Refugee All Stars musical band composed entirely of refugees from Freetown displaced to Guinea during the 1991-2002 civil war in Sierra Leone. The film received critical acclaim and won awards at 12 international film festivals. The film had its premiere in November 2005 in Los Angeles at the American Film Institute's Film Fest, winning the Grand Jury Prize for best documentary.

He is also the co-founder of a film and multi-media educational program entitled 'WeOwnTV' founded for disadvantaged youth in Freetown, Sierra Leone.

== Partial filmography ==
Year	Film	Role	Genre	Ref.
2000	Live! At the Fillmore	Associate producer	TV series	
2005	Sierra Leone's Refugee All Stars	Director, producer	Documentary	
2007	P.O.V.	Director, producer	Home	
2010	Peepers	Associate producer	TV series documentary	
2024	Kite Zo A: Leave the Bones	Producer	Film	

== See also ==
- Nashville Film Festival
