= Alibi (David Gray song) =

2006 single by David Gray

Single by David Gray

from the album Life in Slow Motion
- Released: 27 March 2006
- Length: 4:33 (album version); 3:49 (radio edit)
- Label: Atlantic
- Songwriter: David Gray
- Producer: Marius de Vries

David Gray singles chronology
"Hospital Food" (2005)	"Alibi" (2006)	"You're the World to Me" (2007)

Alternative covers
- CD2 single cover

Alternative cover
- 7-inch vinyl cover

"Alibi" is a song by David Gray. It was released as the third and final single from his seventh studio album, Life in Slow Motion (2005). The single coincided with the release of his Live in Slow Motion DVD, filmed live at the Hammersmith Apollo on 13 December 2005. The version of "Alibi" on CD2 features the live version from the DVD. The single received mixed reviews, and peaked at number 71 on the UK Singles Chart, making it Gray's first single not to chart in the top 40 since the original release of "Please Forgive Me" in 1999. The B-side "Golden Ray" was featured exclusively on the limited edition 7" vinyl version of the single.

== Track listings ==
CD1:

1. "Alibi" (Edit) – 3:49
2. "Tracer" – 4:59

CD2:

1. "Alibi" (Live at the Hammersmith Apollo, 13 December 2005) – 5:30
2. "Long Gone Now" – 3:05
3. "Sacred Ground" – 3:51
4. "Alibi" (Director's Cut/Explicit Version) (enhanced video) – 4:36

Limited edition 7-inch vinyl:

1. "Alibi" (Edit) – 3:49
2. "Golden Ray" – 2:07
