= Be Mine (David Gray song) =

Single by David Gray

from the album A New Day at Midnight
- Released: 7 April 2003
- Genre: Electronic rock
- Length: 3:52 (single remix); 4:24 (album version)
- Label: EastWest
- Songwriter(s): David Gray; Craig McClune
- Producer(s): David Gray; Iestyn Polson; Craig McClune

David Gray singles chronology
"The Other Side" (2002)	"Be Mine" (2003)	"The One I Love" (2005)

"Be Mine" is a song by David Gray. It was released on 7 April 2003 as the second and final single from his sixth studio album A New Day at Midnight. The single peaked on the UK Singles Chart at number 23. "Be Mine" is also included on the album The Best of David Gray released in October 2016.

== Track listings ==
UK CD single

1. "Be Mine" (Radio Remix) – 3:52
2. "Loverboy" – 4:30
3. "Falling Down the Mountainside" (Live at the BBC, December 2002) – 4:40

=== The Best of David Gray ===
1. "Babylon" - 3:38
2. "You're the World to Me" - 3:37
3. "Sail Away" - 5:15
4. "The One I Love" - 3:28
5. "Alibi" - 4:36
6. "Smoke Without Fire" - 2:55
7. "Flame Turns Blue" - 4:51
8. "Be Mine" - 3:51
9. "This Year's Love" - 4:06
10. "Fugitive" - 3:43
11. "Please Forgive Me" - 5:34
12. "Only the Wine" - 2:52
13. "Snow in Vegas (feat. LeAnn Rimes)" - 3:30
14. "Back in the World" - 3:58
15. "The Other Side" - 4:27
16. "Enter Lightly" - 4:50
