= Lost Songs 95–98 =

Lost Songs 95-98

Studio album by David Gray
- Released: 31 July 2000
- Recorded: Protocol Studios; October 20–29, 1999
- Genre: Folk rock
- Length: 36:57
- Labels: IHT/EastWest (UK); RCA/ATO (US)
- Producers: David Gray, Iestyn Polson, and Craig McClune

David Gray chronology
White Ladder (1999)	Lost Songs 95-98 (2000)	The EPs 1992–1994 (2001)

Professional ratings
Review scores
Source	Rating
Allmusic	link

Lost Songs 95–98 is the fifth studio album by musician David Gray. Originally released on 31 July 2000, the album charted at number 55 in the UK. The album was re-released in the UK on 12 February 2001 and charted at number 7. The songs on the album were written between 1995 and 1998, and recorded over ten days in October 1999.

== Track listing ==
All tracks are written by David Gray.

No.	Title	Length
1.	"Flame Turns Blue"	4:53
2.	"Twilight"	2:23
3.	"Hold On"	1:55
4.	"As I'm Leaving"	4:35
5.	"If Your Love Is Real"	3:35
6.	"Tidal Wave"	2:20
7.	"Falling Down the Mountainside"	4:50
8.	"January Rain"	2:45
9.	"Red Moon"	3:26
10.	"A Clean Pair of Eyes"	4:59
11.	"Wurlitzer"	1:19

== Credits ==
=== Musicians ===
- David Gray – vocals, guitar, Wurlitzer
- Craig McClune – drums, bass, backing vocals
- Tim Bradshaw – bass, piano, organ, Wurlitzer

=== Production ===
- Produced by David Gray, Iestyn Polson, and Craig McClune.
- Recorded and mixed by Iestyn Polson.
- Mastered by Dave Turner.
- Design by Yumi Matote.
- Photography by John Ross and Lawrence Watson.

== Charts ==
=== Weekly charts ===
Chart (2001)	Peak position
Irish Albums (IRMA)	1
Scottish Albums (Official Charts)	7
UK Albums (Official Charts)	7
US Billboard 200	153

=== Year-end charts ===
Chart (2001)	Position
UK Albums (OCC)	104

== Certifications ==
Region	Certification	Certified units/sales
United Kingdom (BPI)	Gold	100,000^{^}
^{^} Shipments figures based on certification alone.
