= Gold in a Brass Age =

Studio album by David Gray
- Released: 8 March 2019
- Recorded: June–October 2018
- Label: IHT
- Producer: Ben de Vries

David Gray chronology
Mutineers (2014)	Gold in a Brass Age (2019)	Skellig (2021)

Singles from Gold in a Brass Age
- 1. "The Sapling" Released: 30 November 2018; 2. "A Tight Ship" Released: 4 January 2019; 3. "Watching the Waves" Released: 25 January 2019; 4. "If 8 Were 9" Released: 22 February 2019

Professional ratings
Aggregate scores
Source	Rating
Metacritic	79/100
Review scores
Source	Rating
AllMusic	4/5 stars
American Songwriter	3.5/5 stars
Culture Fly	4/5 stars
God Is In the T.V.	5/10
The Irish Times	4/5 stars
Louder Than War	4/5 stars
PopMatters	7/10 stars
The Spill Magazine	3.5/5 stars
The Times	4/5 stars

Gold in a Brass Age is the eleventh studio album by English musician David Gray. It was released on 8 March 2019 under IHT Records.

== Track listing ==
Gold in a Brass Age track listing
No.	Title	Length
1.	"The Sapling"	3:26
2.	"Gold in a Brass Age"	4:20
3.	"Furthering"	4:32
4.	"Ridiculous Heart"	4:00
5.	"It's Late"	2:15
6.	"A Tight Ship"	4:49
7.	"Watching the Waves"	4:44
8.	"Hall of Mirrors"	4:03
9.	"Hurricane Season"	5:35
10.	"Mallory"	4:45
11.	"If 8 Were 9"	3:40
Total length:		46:08

== Charts ==
Chart (2019)	Peak position
Australian Albums (ARIA)	71
Irish Albums (IRMA)	37
Scottish Albums (OCC)	12
Swiss Albums (Schweizer Hitparade)	45
UK Albums (OCC)	21
US Billboard 200	186
