= Mutineers (album) =

Studio album by David Gray
- Released: 17 June 2014
- Recorded: November 2013 – March 2014
- Studio: The Church Studios
- Genre: Folk rock
- Length: 48:22
- Label: Good Soldier Songs
- Producer: Andy Barlow

David Gray chronology
Foundling (2010)	Mutineers (2014)	Gold in a Brass Age (2019)

Professional ratings
Aggregate scores
Source	Rating
Metacritic	72/100
Review scores
Source	Rating

Mutineers is the tenth studio album by English singer-songwriter David Gray, released on 17 June 2014 on IHT Records, with "Back in the World" as its first single. It was Gray's fifth consecutive US Top 20 album. A decade after its release, Gray said that he is "super proud" of what was "a purposeful first step into the current creative zone, both sonically and thematically".

== Background ==
In the years leading up to the recording of the album, Gray had become exhausted and disillusioned. "Coming out of the Noughties, I just felt beat up, physically and mentally", he told critic Tony Clayton-Lea. "And bored". Gray recounted that he "needed someone else in the studio to help me find the keys to the city; someone who would take me to a place that I hadn't heard before. And that person was Andy Barlow", a producer and musician. He described the collaboration as "a beautiful agony". The pair established a "stringent recording schedule", which unlocked a "creative spontaneity" that Gray found "priceless", and which ultimately "rehumanised" him.

== Release ==
On 1 April 2014, the video for "Gulls" premiered on both the Myles O'Reilly website and Gray's official YouTube channel, with O'Reilly being the director. On 10 April, "Back in the World" was uploaded onto Gray's official YouTube channel. A day later, the song was played by radio presenter Chris Evans on BBC Radio 2 for The Chris Evans Breakfast Show.

== Critical reception ==
Tony Clayton-Lea found that the album saw Gray "reconnect with a fervour" that had been absent since the artist had found massive commercial success with White Ladder. Writing in The Irish Times, the critic said that it was "yet another departure point" for the artist. The Guardian noted "a timeworn quality that's charismatic", in an album where "[optimism] is the overriding theme". It was "the sound of a man gently recuperating from a decade of being defined by his multimillion-selling 1998 album, White Ladder". PopMatters saw it as an overdue sequel, "the kind of follow-up to 1998's smash White Ladder for which longtime fans have been waiting some 16 years", and "the most comfortable Gray has sounded in years".

== Track listing ==
All tracks are written by David Gray except where noted.

Mutineers track listing
No.	Title	Writer(s)	Length
1.	"Back in the World"	Gray, Andy Barlow	3:57
2.	"As the Crow Flies"	Gray, Barlow	4:13
3.	"Mutineers"		5:01
4.	"Beautiful Agony"	Gray, Barlow	4:04
5.	"Last Summer"		4:13
6.	"Snow in Vegas"		4:21
7.	"Cake and Eat It"		2:33
8.	"Birds of the High Arctic"	Gray, Barlow	6:24
9.	"The Incredible"	Gray, Robbie Malone	3:23
10.	"Girl Like You"		5:18
11.	"Gulls"		4:55
Total length:			48:22

Bonus track version
No.	Title	Length
12.	"Nearly Midnight"	3:51
Total length:		52:13

== Personnel ==
- David Gray – vocals, pianos, guitars, keyboards, harp, harmonica, Juno synthesizer
- Rob Malone – bass, acoustic, electric and nylon string guitars, e-bow, high strung guitar
- Keith Prior – drums, percussion
- Caroline Dale – cello
- Andy Barlow – programming

== Charts ==
Chart performance for Mutineers
Chart (2014)	Peak position
Australian Albums (ARIA)	22
Austrian Albums (Ö3 Austria)	67
Belgian Albums (Ultratop Flanders)	57
Dutch Albums (Album Top 100)	31
German Albums (Offizielle Top 100)	53
Irish Albums (IRMA)	7
New Zealand Albums (RMNZ)	36
Swiss Albums (Schweizer Hitparade)	27
UK Albums (OCC)	10
US Billboard 200	15
