= Fugitive (song) =

Single by David Gray

from the album Draw the Line
- B-side: "Jitterbug"
- Released: 7 September 2009
- Recorded: 2008
- Genre: Folk rock
- Length: 3:46
- Label: Polydor
- Songwriters: David Gray, Rob Malone, Keith Prior
- Producer: David Gray

David Gray singles chronology
"You're the World to Me" (2007)	"Fugitive" (2009)	"Full Steam" (2009)

"Fugitive" is the first single taken from David Gray's eighth studio album Draw the Line. The song had its first exclusive play on Ken Bruce's BBC Radio 2 show on 21 July 2009 and was released in the UK on 7 September 2009.

Gray stated in an interview that the title and lyrics of the track were inspired by an image he had of Saddam Hussein being pulled out of his spider hole. Gray performed the song on 25 September 2009 on the Late Show with David Letterman and an acoustic version on GMTV, saying that the song was "about hiding from life, from yourself. It's saying don't forsake it all because there's something keeping you upright and keeping you walking down the street." The single features the exclusive B-side "Jitterbug."

"Fugitive" was chosen as the Starbucks–iTunes "Pick of the Week" for September 15, 2009.

== Music video ==
The music video was directed by Dan Lumb and features Gray performing live at the piano. As he sings, the surrounding walls, floor and ceiling fill with images expressing the mood and urgency of the song. Gray was shot over a day and artist/animator Will Barras meticulously painted each scene on to the walls, etc. to mirror Gray's performance the following day.

== Critical and commercial reception ==
"Fugitive" received generally positive reviews. Digital Spy called it "a solid return" while MusicOMH labeled it "an excellent, upbeat lead single", but the BBC reported that almost 2 weeks after its release, it had yet to crack the top 100 on the UK Singles Chart. The single also performed poorly on the Swiss Music Charts, where it entered and peaked at number 84, charting for only one week. However, the song was more successful in the United States, where it topped the Adult Alternative Airplay chart for 10 consecutive weeks.

== Personnel ==
- David Gray - vocals, piano, acoustic guitar, Wurlitzer, hi-strung, vox organ, vibraphone, harmonium
- Neill MacColl - electric guitar, acoustic guitar, mandolin, hi-strung, backing vocals
- Robbie Malone - bass, electric guitar, acoustic guitar, harmonium, backing vocals
- Keith Prior - drums, percussion, backing vocals
- Iestyn Polson - programming

== Track listing ==
1. "Fugitive" – 3:46
2. "Jitterbug" – 3:26
