= Skellig (album) =

Studio album by David Gray
- Released: 19 February 2021
- Studio: Clashnarrow Studios, Scotland, UK
- Genre: Irish folk music
- Length: 56:13
- Language: English
- Label: AWAL/Laugh a Minute Records
- Producer: David Gray; Ben de Vries

David Gray chronology
Gold in a Brass Age (2019)	Skellig (2021)	Dear Life (2025)

The whole nature of this record and this music is that it's full of space and full of words and ideas—and you travel into it. It doesn't sort of come and knock at your door. It's very much a record you have to give to. So I think that this is a perfect time. Everybody understands this sort of inward direction of travel—because we’ve all been forced into it. So that's just a weird coincidence. And the themes of the record—of isolation and escape and also sort of the difficulties of living in the modern world with all of its demands and its insanity—have only been amplified during lock down. It's been a pretty crazy year on every level.

—David Gray on themes of Skellig and the listening experience during the COVID-19 pandemic

Skellig is the twelfth studio album by British singer-songwriter David Gray.

== Reception ==
According to the review aggregator Metacritic, Skellig received "universal acclaim" based on a weighted average score of 87 out of 100 from four critic scores. Editors at AllMusic rated this album 4 out of 5 stars, with critic James Christopher Monger writing that this album is "a notable departure from the folktronica neo-soul" in Gray's previous work and while it "bears the hallmarks of a Gray production" this music is "undeniably minimalist" and with an Irish quality that comes from his collaborators. American Songwriter's Lee Zimmerman scored Skellig a 4.5 out of 5 stars, stating that it "hews to the haunting delivery and ethereal atmospherics that have characterized his work practically since day one" and "it represented a certain solace and escape from the increasing distraction of the noise and intrusion that always seems so overwhelming in today’s modern world" due to the Irish character of the music. Tony Clayton-Lea of The Irish Times scored this album 4 out of 5 stars, characterizing the music as "sublime calm" and "a serene career highlight". Ben Hogwood rated Skellig 4 out of 5 stars for musicOMH, calling it "a searching piece of work" that could "provid[e] solace for those who need it". Writing for RTÉ, Alan Corr scored Skellig 3 out of 5 stars, noting "a distinctly restless and yearning quality" and recommended listeners to try the album with headphones. Neil McCormick called this album "not for the faint-hearted" due to its "lyrically dense and musically spartan songs" and gave it 4 out of 5 stars in The Daily Telegraph.

== Track listing ==
All songs written by David Gray.

1. "Skellig" – 5:01
2. "Dún Laoghaire" – 4:32
3. "Accumulates" – 4:58
4. "Heart and Soul" – 4:20
5. "Laughing Gas" – 3:21
6. "No False Gods" – 2:09
7. "Deep Water Swim" – 4:08
8. "Spiral Arms" – 6:55
9. "The White Owl" – 3:49
10. "Dares My Heart Be Free" – 6:05
11. "House with No Walls" – 3:43
12. "Can’t Hurt More Than This" – 4:33
13. "All That We Asked For" – 2:38

== Personnel ==
- David Gray – guitar, piano, keyboards, synthesizer, vocals, production, artwork
- Amanda Chiu – design
- Caroline Dale – cello, vocals
- Niamh Farrell – vocals
- Jake Hutton – audio engineering
- David Kitt – guitar, synthesizer, vocals, programming, additional recording on "Dares My Heart Be Free"
- Robbie Malone – bass guitar, percussion, vocals
- Mossy Nolan – vocals
- Keith Prior – drums, percussion
- Dave Turner – audio mastering at 360 Mastering, Hastings, England, United Kingdom
- Ben de Vries – piano, percussion, vocals, programming, production

== Chart performance ==
Skellig reached 53 on the UK Albums Chart and topped out at 22 on the Irish Albums Chart.

== See also ==
- 2021 in British music
- List of 2021 albums
