= The EPs 1992–1994 =

Compilation album by David Gray
- Released: 2 July 2001
- Recorded: 1992–1994
- Genre: Folk rock
- Length: 42:14
- Label: Hut/Virgin
- Producer: David Gray, David Anderson

David Gray chronology
Lost Songs 95–98 (2000)	The EPs 1992–1994 (2001)	A New Day at Midnight (2002)

Professional ratings
Review scores
Source	Rating
Allmusic	link

The EPs 1992–1994 is a compilation album by David Gray, released in July 2001. The compilation's release coincided with Hut Records' reissues of Gray's first two albums, A Century Ends and Flesh. The EPs 1992–1994 collects the singles and their B-sides released during that time period, as well as the enhanced music videos for "Shine" and "Wisdom."

== Track listing ==
All tracks are written by David Gray

No.	Title	Length
1.	"Birds Without Wings"	4:49
2.	"L's Song"	4:14
3.	"The Light"	3:51
4.	"Shine" (Edit)	4:24
5.	"Brick Walls"	4:56
6.	"The Rice"	3:28
7.	"Wisdom"	4:15
8.	"Lovers"	3:22
9.	"4AM"	2:42
10.	"Coming Down"	6:13

Enhanced section
No.	Title	Length
1.	"Shine" (Video directed by Tony van Ende)
2.	"Wisdom" (Video directed by Lindy Heymann)

== Credits ==
=== Musicians ===
- David Gray – vocals, guitar

=== Production ===
- Produced by David Gray and David Anderson.
