= A Thousand Miles Behind =

Live album by David Gray
- Released: 13 August 2007
- Recorded: 2001–2007
- Genre: Folk rock
- Label: Self-released
- Producer: David Gray

David Gray chronology
| Shine: The Best of the Early Years (2007) | A Thousand Miles Behind (2007) | Greatest Hits (2007) |

A Thousand Miles Behind is an album by English singer-songwriter David Gray. Released in August 2007, it contains twelve live covers recorded between 2001 and 2007. The album title comes from a line in Bob Dylan's song "One Too Many Mornings" (1964). The compilation is only available from Gray's official website or at Gray's live performances. There are four versions of the album available for purchase, at different prices: as a CD, a 128 kbit/s mp3 download, a 256 kbit/s mp3 download, or a flac format. The tracks can also be downloaded individually in all of the digital formats.

== Track listing ==
| No. | Title | Writer(s) | Length |
|---|---|---|---|
| 1. | "Song to the Siren" | Larry Beckett, Tim Buckley | 4:35 |
| 2. | "To Ramona" | Bob Dylan | 5:32 |
| 3. | "One with the Birds" | Will Oldham | 5:22 |
| 4. | "Long Black Veil" | Danny Dill, Marijohn Wilkin | 3:50 |
| 5. | "One Too Many Mornings" | Bob Dylan | 2:39 |
| 6. | "I Think It's Going to Rain Today" | Randy Newman | 2:30 |
| 7. | "Mansion on the Hill" | Bruce Springsteen | 3:27 |
| 8. | "In the Morning" | Barry Gibb | 3:10 |
| 9. | "I Tremble for You" | Johnny Cash, Lew DeWitt | 3:01 |
| 10. | "Buckets of Rain" | Bob Dylan | 3:22 |
| 11. | "Go Down Easy" | John Martyn | 4:18 |
| 12. | "Streets of Philadelphia" | Bruce Springsteen | 4:29 |
