= A New Day at Midnight =

Studio album by David Gray
- Released: 28 October 2002
- Recorded: March–July 2002
- Genre: Folktronica
- Length: 50:41
- Label: iht (Distribution); East West (UK); ATO (US)
- Producer: David Gray; Iestyn Polson; Craig McClune

David Gray chronology
The EPs 1992–1994 (2001)	A New Day at Midnight (2002)	Life in Slow Motion (2005)

Singles from A New Day at Midnight
- 1. "The Other Side" Released: 9 December 2002; 2. "Be Mine" Released: 7 April 2003

A New Day at Midnight is the sixth studio album by British singer-songwriter David Gray, released on 28 October 2002 in the UK by East West Records and IHT Records and November 5, 2002 in the United States by the former RCA imprint ATO Records and iht as well. The album entered the UK Albums Chart at No. 1 upon its opening week, and spent a total of 49 weeks on the chart.

Two singles were released from A New Day at Midnight: "The Other Side" in December 2002, and "Be Mine" in April 2003. "Dead in the Water" was released as a promo-only single in November 2002. Both singles failed to break into the top 20 of the UK Singles Chart, peaking at No. 35 and No. 23 respectively. The album received critically mixed reviews, but went on to be certified platinum four times.

The album is dedicated to David Gray's father, Peter, who died of cancer in 2001, at the height of Gray's popularity. A song titled "A New Day at Midnight", written about the birth of Gray's first daughter, Ivy, was written during the album's sessions but was not included on the album.

Professional ratings
Aggregate scores
Source	Rating
Metacritic	71/100
Review scores
Source	Rating
AllMusic	3/5 stars
The Guardian	4/5 stars
Kludge	8/10
The Music Box	4/5 stars
NME	4/10 stars

== Track listing ==
All tracks are written by David Gray, except where noted.

A New Day at Midnight track listing
No.	Title	Writer(s)	Length
1.	"Dead in the Water"	Gray	3:07
2.	"Caroline"	Gray	3:39
3.	"Long Distance Call"	Gray	3:42
4.	"Freedom"	Gray	6:48
5.	"Kangaroo"	Gray	3:32
6.	"Last Boat to America"	Gray	4:50
7.	"Real Love"	Gray, McClune	4:40
8.	"Knowhere"	Gray, Malone	3:55
9.	"December"	Gray	3:35
10.	"Be Mine"	Gray, McClune	4:24
11.	"Easy Way to Cry"	Gray	3:53
12.	"The Other Side"	Gray	4:31

Japan-only bonus track
No.	Title	Writer(s)	Length
13.	"Lorelei"	Gray	3:20

== Personnel ==
=== Musicians ===
- All instrumentation by David Gray and Craig McClune
- Tony Shanaghan – backing vocals on "Caroline", "Kangaroo" and "Easy Way to Cry"
- Rob Malone – bass guitar on "Caroline", "Long Distance Call", "Freedom", "Last Boat to America", "Real Love", "Knowhere" and "Easy Way to Cry"
- Tim Bradshaw – piano on "Real Love" and "Easy Way to Cry", Wurlitzer on "Long Distance Call", electric guitar on "Freedom", lap steel on "Last Boat to America", drone keys on "Knowhere", backwards synth on "December"
- B. J. Cole – pedal steel on "Caroline"
- Wrecking Crew – orchestra on "Long Distance Call", brass on "Freedom", string quartet on "Easy Way to Cry"

=== Production ===
- Produced by David Gray, Iestyn Polson, and Craig McClune
- Mixed by Fred Defaye and Simon Changer
- Recorded and programmed by Iestyn Polson
- Mastered by George Marino
- Compiled by Dave Turner and Gus Shaw

== Charts ==
=== Weekly charts ===
Weekly chart performance for A New Day at Midnight
Chart (2002)	Peak position
Australian Albums (ARIA)	22
Dutch Albums (Album Top 100)	81
French Albums (SNEP)	122
German Albums (Offizielle Top 100)	61
Irish Albums (IRMA)	1
Italian Albums (FIMI)	37
New Zealand Albums (RMNZ)	6
Norwegian Albums (VG-lista)	29
Swedish Albums (Sverigetopplistan)	45
Swiss Albums (Schweizer Hitparade)	45
UK Albums (OCC)	1
US Billboard 200	17

=== Year-end charts ===
2002 year-end chart performance for A New Day at Midnight
Chart (2002)	Position
Canadian Alternative Albums (Nielsen SoundScan)	92
UK Albums (OCC)	13

2003 year-end chart performance for A New Day at Midnight
Chart (2003)	Position
UK Albums (OCC)	45

== Certifications ==
Certifications for A New Day at Midnight
Region	Certification	Certified units/sales
Australia (ARIA)	Gold	35,000^{^}
Canada (Music Canada)	Gold	50,000^{^}
Ireland (IRMA)	6× Platinum	90,000^{^}
New Zealand (RMNZ)	Platinum	15,000^{^}
United Kingdom (BPI)	4× Platinum	1,213,117
United States (RIAA)	Gold	604,000
Summaries
Europe (IFPI)	Platinum	1,000,000^{*}
^{*} Sales figures based on certification alone.^{^} Shipments figures based on certification alone.
