= Iestyn Polson =

English musician and producer

- Born: Iestyn Polson
- Origin: London, England
- Occupations: Record Producer, Mixer & Engineer

Iestyn Polson is an English music producer, engineer, songwriter, musician, and mixer best known for his work with David Gray, Patti Smith and David Bowie. Originally from London, Polson is currently based in New York City.

Iestyn Polson grew up in London, England, and formed his first band at age 11. Polson learned to play multiple instruments throughout his childhood and later became interested in record production. Through engineering in studios in London, Polson was introduced to singer/songwriter David Gray who was compiling demos at the time. The two began working together resulting in the multi-platinum selling album White Ladder. The album was made for less than $5,000 in the UK singer-songwriter's London apartment, and combines Gray's now signature sound of electronic grooves and acoustic folk. Polson used custom loops and samples programmed and sequenced with an Akai sampler. Iestyn has collaborated with David Gray on every album since then including the most recent forthcoming album.

In addition to Polson's collaboration with Gray, he has produced and engineered albums for Simple Kid, David Bowie, David Usher, Patti Smith, and James Maddock. Iestyn Polson is represented exclusively by Global Positioning Services in Santa Monica and New York City.

== Discography ==
Artist	Album	Producer	Engineer	Mixer	Programmer
Chris Velan	The Long Goodbye		check	check	check
Lora Faye	Waltzes	check			
The Traveling Band	Hands Up EP		check	check	check
David Gray	Forthcoming Album	check	check	check	
Patti Smith	Banga		check		
Reed Waddle	Creatures of the Heart	check	check	check	
James Maddock	Wake Up And Dream	check	check	check	
Chris Velan	Fables For Fighters	check	check	check	
James Maddock	Live at the Rockwood Music Hall		check	check	
David Gray	Foundling	co-P	check	check	
David Gray	Draw the Line	co-P	check	check	
David Gray	A New Day at Midnight	co-P	check	check	check
David Gray	Lost Songs	co-P	check	check	check
David Gray	White Ladder	co-P	check	check	check
David Gray	Life in Slow Motion	co-P	check		check
Heron	Smoking in Bed	ad-P	re-M		
David Bowie	Live in Santa Monica				re-Mast
Paul Hartnoll	Ideal Condition			check	
Hard-Fi	Once Upon a Time in the West				check
Simple Kid	SK2		check	check	check
Venus Hum	Soul Sloshing	ad-P		re-M	
Akayzia Parker	Reckless	check	check		check
Sean Jackson	Slots	check		check	check
