= Foundling (album) =

Studio album by David Gray
- Released: 16 August 2010
- Recorded: January–May 2010
- Genre: Folk rock
- Length: 69:03
- Label: Polydor (UK); Mercer Street/Downtown (US)
- Producer: David Gray; Iestyn Polson; Robbie Malone

David Gray chronology
Draw the Line (2009)	Foundling (2010)	Mutineers (2014)

Singles from Foundling
- 1. "A Moment Changes Everything" Released: 13 July 2010

Foundling is the ninth studio album by English singer-songwriter David Gray, released on 16 August 2010 in the United Kingdom, and on the following day in the United States, by Mercer Street/Downtown Records. Despite his prediction that it would "disappear off the face of the earth", it became David Gray's first, and only, top 10 album in the US.

== Album information ==
Foundling was announced after plans for a reissue of Gray's preceding album, Draw the Line, were cancelled. The reissue was scheduled to include B-sides and unreleased tracks from the Draw the Line sessions, which included "A Moment" (released as the first single under the new title "A Moment Changes Everything"), "Old Father Time", and "More to Me Now".

Described as a "private record", Gray states that he has "never taken the dynamics [as] low as I have done on this record. I had to have faith in writing and understatement — the things I hold as my strengths. I'm as proud of it as anything I've done." Gray's commercial expectations, however, were low: "This record is going to disappear off the face of the earth, bar some freak occurrence." Foundling is described as "the closing chapter for Draw The Line, and...needs to be presented in a different way."

== Critical reception ==
Professional ratings
Aggregate scores
Source	Rating
Metacritic	62/100
Review scores
Source	Rating
AllMusic	3/5 stars

The album received mixed-to-negative reviews. The Guardian said it was "nothing new" but "high-quality adult pop". The Daily Telegraph wrote that the album "is unlikely to win Gray new fans but is as rich and heartfelt as admirers have come to expect." The Independent gave the album 2 out of 5 stars and called it "fairly grim" and "so swaddled in 'poetic' obfuscation it's hard to summon enough interest to decode [it]", adding that while Foundling is "restrained, understated, graceful," it is "unlikely to repeat White Ladder's success." MusicOMH also gave the album 2 out of 5 stars, saying it "does become slightly wearisome after a while." Drowned in Sound gave Foundling a 6/10 rating, calling it "out of time, often boring, but...just too competent to lend itself to any fun." The Evening Standard called the album "safe", but Q magazine, on the other hand, wrote that Gray is "getting more interesting with each release". Review aggregator AnyDecentMusic? collated ten reviews, resulting in an "ADM Rating" of 5.7.

== Track listing ==
All tracks are written by David Gray.

Foundling track listing
No.	Title	Length
1.	"Only the Wine"	2:52
2.	"Foundling"	5:29
3.	"Forgetting"	4:18
4.	"Gossamer Thread"	5:11
5.	"The Old Chair"	2:55
6.	"In God's Name"	3:42
7.	"We Could Fall in Love Again Tonight"	4:26
8.	"Holding On"	5:10
9.	"When I Was in Your Heart"	2:37
10.	"A New Day at Midnight"	2:46
11.	"Davey Jones' Locker"	5:11

Bonus disc – Not available in UK edition
No.	Title	Length
1.	"Fixative"	4:07
2.	"Morning Theme"	2:43
3.	"The Dotted Line"	3:43
4.	"A Million Years"	3:11
5.	"Who's Singing Now"	3:02
6.	"Old Father Time"	4:01
7.	"Indeed I Will"	3:28
8.	"A Moment Changes Everything"	3:28

iTunes-only bonus track
No.	Title	Length
9.	"More to Me Now"	2:43

== Personnel ==
- David Gray – vocals, guitar, piano, harmonium, Wurlitzer, suitcase organ, harmonica, synth, vox organ
- Keith Prior – drums, percussion
- Robbie Malone – bass, acoustic and electric guitars, bouzouki, harmonium, backing vocals
- Neill MacColl – acoustic and electric guitars, backing vocals
- James Hallawell – piano on "Davey Jones' Locker"
- Iestyn Polson – programming on "Holding On" and bass piano on "Foundling"
- Caroline Dale – cellos on "Forgetting"
- Felim Gormley – saxophone on "Foundling" and "We Can Fall in Love Again"
- Andy Warrington – hurdy-gurdy on "In God's Name"
- Tim Bradshaw – guitar on "A New Day at Midnight"
- Dave Nolte – keyboards on "A New Day at Midnight"

== Charts ==
Chart performance for Foundling
Chart (2010)	Peak position
Australian Albums (ARIA)	34
Belgian Albums (Ultratop Flanders)	70
Dutch Albums (Album Top 100)	55
Greek Albums (IFPI Greece)	36
Irish Albums (IRMA)	9
Swiss Albums (Schweizer Hitparade)	26
UK Albums (OCC)	18
US Billboard 200	9
