= Hospital Food (song) =

2005 single by David Gray

Single by David Gray

from the album Life in Slow Motion
- B-side: Smile Like You Mean It (live); "Baltimore" (live); "Crimson Lightning"
- Released: 28 November 2005
- Length: 4:45 (album version); 4:03 (radio edit)
- Label: IHT; Atlantic
- Songwriters: David Gray; Rob Malone
- Producer: Marius de Vries

David Gray singles chronology
"The One I Love" (2005)	"Hospital Food" (2005)	"Alibi" (2006)

"Hospital Food" is a song by British singer-songwriter David Gray, released on 28 November 2005 as the second single from his seventh studio album, Life in Slow Motion (2005). The song was produced by producer Marius de Vries and received mixed reviews upon its release, many critics citing it as a disappointing follow-up to its more well-received predecessor, "The One I Love". "Hospital Food" peaked at number 34 on the UK Singles Chart and remains Gray's last single to reach the UK top 40.

== Track listings ==
UK CD1 and 7-inch single

1. "Hospital Food" (radio edit)
2. "Smile Like You Mean It" (BBC Radio 1 Live version; the Killers cover)

UK CD2

1. "Hospital Food" (album version)
2. "Baltimore" (live at V2003; Randy Newman cover)
3. "Crimson Lightning"
4. "Hospital Food" (live at The Church Studios, 26 July 2005) (video)

== Charts ==
Weekly chart performance for "Hospital Food"
Chart (2005)	Peak position
Ireland (IRMA)	40
Scotland Singles (Official Charts)	28
UK Singles (Official Charts)	34

== Release history ==
Release dates and formats for "Hospital Food"
Region	Date	Format(s)	Label(s)	Ref.
United Kingdom	28 November 2005	CD	IHT; Atlantic	
Australia	27 February 2006	CD	IHT; Atlantic	
