= Flesh (album) =

Studio album by David Gray
- Released: 6 September 1994
- Recorded: February–June 1994
- Genre: Folk rock
- Length: 45:18
- Label: Hut/Virgin (UK); Caroline Records (US)
- Producer: David Gray

David Gray chronology
A Century Ends (1993)	Flesh (1994)	Sell, Sell, Sell (1996)

Alternate Cover
- Cover of 2001 reissue. The above image was originally used as back cover of the original 1994 release.

Professional ratings
Review scores
Source	Rating
AllMusic	4/5 stars
The Encyclopedia of Popular Music	3/5 stars
The New Rolling Stone Album Guide	3/5 stars

Flesh is the second studio album by David Gray. It was initially released on 6 September 1994, and re-released in 2001. The cover was changed to a black and white photo for the re-release.

== Critical reception ==
Trouser Press wrote that the musicians are led "into semi-electric ladyland on Flesh, using grander arrangements that, thanks to an excess of extroversion in the overall effort, turn the Gaelic aspect of Gray’s music dismayingly toward the Waterboys ... a disappointment."

== Track listing ==
All tracks are written by David Gray.

No.	Title	Length
1.	"What Are You?"	3:30
2.	"The Light"	4:10
3.	"Coming Down"	6:15
4.	"Falling Free"	3:25
5.	"Made Up My Mind"	3:43
6.	"Mystery of Love"	5:32
7.	"Lullaby"	3:39
8.	"New Horizons"	5:56
9.	"Love's Old Song"	3:47
10.	"Flesh"	5:21

== Credits ==
=== Musicians ===
- David Gray – vocals, guitar
- Neil MacColl – backing vocals (track 5), guitar (tracks 1–3, 5 & 8–10), mandolin (tracks 2 & 9), autoharp (track 3), slide guitar (track 6), hi-strung guitar (track 8), Danelectro guitar (track 10)
- David Nolte – bass
- Seamus Beaghen – piano
- Andy Metcalfe – organ, piano
- Craig McClune – drums, percussion (1, 2 & 10)
- Roy Dodds – drums, percussion (tracks 3, 5, 6, 8 & 9)
- Simon Edwards – acoustic bass

=== Production ===
- Recorded by Jim Abbiss; except tracks 3, 6, 9, and 10 recorded by Jim Abbiss and Jock Loveland, and track 7 recorded by David Gray.
- Mixed by Neil MacColl, Jim Abbiss, and David Gray.
- Photography by John Ross, Lawrence Watson, Richard J. Burbridge, and Thomas Krygier.
