= The One I Love (David Gray song) =

2005 single by David Gray

- UK CD1 single cover

Single by David Gray

from the album Life in Slow Motion
- B-side: "Going in Blind" (piano and string version); "With Open Arms"; "Everybody's Leaving Town"
- Released: 29 August 2005
- Length: 3:25
- Label: IHT; Atlantic
- Songwriters: David Gray; Craig McClune
- Producer: Marius de Vries

David Gray singles chronology
"Be Mine" (2003)	"The One I Love" (2005)	"Hospital Food" (2005)

"The One I Love" is a song by British singer-songwriter David Gray. It was released on 29 August 2005 as the first single from his seventh studio album, Life in Slow Motion (2005). The song was produced by Marius de Vries and is Gray's second-highest achievement on the UK Singles Chart, peaking at number eight. Worldwide, the song reached number six in Ireland and number 31 in New Zealand. In the United States, it topped the Billboard Triple-A chart for six weeks.

"The One I Love" was released as a two-CD single and 7-inch vinyl set. "Everybody's Leaving Town", the B-side on CD1 and the 7-inch, also appears on the Japanese version of Life in Slow Motion as a bonus track.

== Track listings ==
UK CD1 and 7-inch single

1. "The One I Love"
2. "Going in Blind" (piano and string version)

UK CD2

1. "The One I Love" (acoustic)
2. "With Open Arms"
3. "Everybody's Leaving Town"

European CD single

1. "The One I Love" (album version)
2. "With Open Arms"
3. "Everybody's Leaving Town"

== Charts ==
=== Weekly charts ===
Weekly chart performance for "The One I Love"
Chart (2005)	Peak position
Australia (ARIA)	59
Austria (Ö3 Austria Top 40)	48
Belgium (Ultratip Bubbling Under Flanders)	5
Germany (GfK)	96
Ireland (IRMA)	6
Netherlands (Single Top 100)	93
New Zealand (Recorded Music NZ)	31
Scotland Singles (Official Charts)	5
UK Singles (Official Charts)	8
US Adult Alternative Airplay (Billboard)	1
US Adult Pop Airplay (Billboard)	38

=== Year-end charts ===
Year-end chart performance for "The One I Love"
Chart (2005)	Position
UK Singles (OCC)	84
US Triple-A (Billboard)	12

== Certifications ==
Certifications for "The One I Love"
Region	Certification	Certified units/sales
New Zealand (RMNZ)	Gold	15,000^{‡}
United Kingdom (BPI)	Silver	200,000^{‡}
^{‡} Sales+streaming figures based on certification alone.

== Release history ==
Release history and formats for "The One I Love"
Region	Date	Format(s)	Label(s)	Ref(s).
United States	25 July 2005	Hot adult contemporary; triple A radio	ATO; RCA	
United States	29 August 2005	Digital download	ATO; RCA	
United Kingdom	29 August 2005	7-inch vinyl; CD; digital download	IHT; Atlantic	
Australia	10 October 2005	CD	IHT; Atlantic	
