= Craig McClune =

British musician

- Occupations: Drummer, songwriter, producer
- Instruments: Drums, percussion, backing vocals, bass guitar

Craig McClune, commonly known as Clune, is a British musician and producer, known mostly as the drummer, percussionist, backing vocalist and bass player for David Gray. He first appeared with Gray on his second studio album, 1994's Flesh, and subsequently on Sell, Sell, Sell (1996), the 1998 platinum-certified White Ladder (described as one of the biggest albums of the 21st century), its 2001 follow-up, Lost Songs 95–98, A New Day at Midnight (2002) and 2005's Life in Slow Motion.

== Early career ==
McClune was drummer in The Flaming Mussolinis, who were active between 1984 and 1988.

== David Gray ==
Gray supported Clune's band at the Wag Club in London in 1990. The two connected and stayed in touch.

About McClune, David Gray said: "[He] is the musician I'm closest to. In general, I listen more for the melody, the general atmosphere, or the words and vocals. Clune helps me figure out what I want to feel from the rhythm and drums. But he’s more than a drummer – he played most of the bass lines on the record as well."

McClune and Gray parted ways in 2007, after fourteen years together, initially as a two-piece. He was replaced by Keith Pryor. They reunited in 2022 for a tour marking the 20th anniversary of the 2000 reissue of White Ladder, which catapulted Gray to fame. The tour was delayed two years due to the COVID-19 pandemic.
