= You're the World to Me =

Single by David Gray

from the album Greatest Hits
- Released: 5 November 2007
- Genre: Piano rock
- Length: 3:38
- Label: Atlantic
- Songwriter: David Gray
- Producers: Chris Thomas, David Gray

David Gray singles chronology
"Alibi" (2006)	"You're the World to Me" (2007)	"Fugitive" (2009)

"You're the World to Me" is the first single taken from David Gray's Greatest Hits album. The single was produced by producer Chris Thomas and released on 5 November 2007. In an interview, Gray described the song as "joyous" and his new Greatest Hits album as "a bag of happy shit".

The single peaked at number 53 on the UK Singles Chart, charting for three weeks, making it Gray's second consecutive single not to chart in the top 40.

== Track listing ==
CD1 (ATUK071CD1):

1. "You're the World to Me" – 3:38

CD2 (ATUK071CD2):

1. "You're the World to Me" – 3:38
2. "Song to the Siren" (Live in San Diego; Tim Buckley cover) – 4:26

Double promo CD:
Disc 1:

1. "You're the World to Me" (Radio Edit) – 3:32

Disc 2 (Greatest Hits sampler):

1. "Babylon" – 3:39
2. "You're the World to Me" (Album Version) – 3:38
3. "Be Mine" – 3:53
4. "Sail Away" – 5:15
5. "The One I Love" – 3:28
6. "Please Forgive Me" – 5:35
