= The Other Side (David Gray song) =

Single by David Gray

from the album A New Day at Midnight
- Released: 9 December 2002
- Genre: Rock
- Length: 4:31
- Label: EastWest (EW259CD)
- Songwriter(s): David Gray
- Producer(s): David Gray, Iestyn Polson, Craig McClune

David Gray singles chronology
"Say Hello Wave Goodbye" (2001)	"The Other Side" (2002)	"Be Mine" (2003)

"The Other Side" is a song by David Gray. It was released on 9 December 2002 as the first single from his sixth studio album A New Day at Midnight. The song deals with the theme of death (as Gray's father died in 2001.), in the context of a heartbreaking failed relationship and the author's reflections on his own and his ex-partner's emotional and spiritual failings. The B-side "Lorelei" also appeared on the Japanese pressing of the album as a bonus track. A rare official remix by Novation was released as a promo-only vinyl, but has never been released on any other format. The single peaked on the UK Singles Chart at #35.

== Track listings ==
UK CD single

1. "The Other Side" – 4:31
2. "Decipher" – 2:32
3. "Lorelei" – 3:23

US 7" promo-only vinyl

1. "The Other Side"
2. "Babylon" (Live at Joe's Pub)

UK 12" promo-only vinyl

1. "The Other Side" (Novation Remix)
