= Life in Slow Motion =

Studio album by David Gray
- Released: 12 September 2005
- Recorded: June 2004–June 2005
- Genre: Folk rock
- Length: 44:31
- Label: Atlantic (UK); ATO/RCA/BMG (US); iht
- Producer: Marius de Vries; David Gray; Iestyn Polson; Craig McClune; Rob Malone

David Gray chronology
A New Day at Midnight (2002)	Life in Slow Motion (2005)	Shine: The Best of the Early Years (2007)

Singles from Life in Slow Motion
- 1. "The One I Love" Released: 29 August 2005; 2. "Hospital Food" Released: 28 November 2005; 3. "Alibi" Released: 27 March 2006

Professional ratings
Aggregate scores
Source	Rating
Metacritic	69/100
Review scores
Source	Rating
AllMusic	3/5 stars
Music Box	3.5/5 stars
PopMatters	6/10
Slant Magazine	3.5/5 stars

Life in Slow Motion is the seventh studio album by English singer-songwriter David Gray, released on 12 September 2005 in Europe and on the following day in the United States. Following a muted response to his previous album, A New Day at Midnight, the album was seen by some as a return to the form that brought Gray international acclaim with White Ladder; it was also the last album recorded with longtime collaborator Craig McClune.

Gray cited Sigur Rós, Sparklehorse, Lucinda Williams, Björk and Mercury Rev as inspirations for the album. The album was Gray's first to use a cello player. The original choice to produce was Daniel Lanois, but he was booked, so Gray ended up using Marius de Vries, who'd produced Gray's hit single "Sail Away."

The three singles from the album were "The One I Love", "Hospital Food", and "Alibi". The album was also released on DualDisc format, which included a documentary of the making of the album, a photo gallery, and complete lyrics on the DVD side of the disc.

The non-DualDisc CD of the album was one of many titles released with the infamous MediaMax CD-3 copyright protection system.

== Chart and sales figures ==
Life in Slow Motion debuted at No. 1 on the Irish Albums Chart, staying for three weeks at the top before dropping to No. 4. In the United Kingdom a week after release in Ireland, it debuted also at No. 1 on the UK Albums Chart, spending two weeks at No. 1 before dropping to #3; it spent seven weeks in the top 10 and 25 weeks in the top 75. The album debuted and subsequently peaked at No. 16 on the U.S. Billboard 200 album chart.

== Track listing ==
All tracks are written by David Gray, with additional songwriters as noted.

No.	Title	Writer(s)	Length
1.	"Alibi"		4:33
2.	"The One I Love"	Craig McClune	3:25
3.	"Lately"	McClune, Rob Malone, Tim Bradshaw, David Nolte	4:13
4.	"Nos Da Cariad"	McClune, Malone, Bradshaw, Nolte	4:10
5.	"Slow Motion"	McClune	5:00
6.	"From Here You Can Almost See the Sea"		3:39
7.	"Ain't No Love"		3:21
8.	"Hospital Food"	Malone	4:43
9.	"Now and Always"		6:45
10.	"Disappearing World"		5:05
Total length:			44:31

== Credits ==
=== Musicians ===
- David Gray – vocals, piano, acoustic and electric guitar, harmonium, Wurlitzer, melodica
- Craig McClune – drums, percussion, dulcimer, glockenspiel, whistles, backing vocals
- Rob Malone – electric and double bass, acoustic and electric guitar, percussion
- Tim Bradshaw – piano, keyboards, electric and lap steel guitar, cello
- David Nolte – electric guitar, cello, melodica, autoharp, samples, backing vocals
- Marius de Vries – percussion, autoharp, recorder, glockenspiel, synthesizer, backing vocals
- Natalie Mendoza – backing vocals
- Caroline Dale – cello
- Strings on tracks 1, 2, and 7: contracted by Isobel Griffiths
- Gavyn Wright – orchestra leader
- Brass on tracks 1 and 5: performed by The Kick Horns
  - Trumpet by Roddy Lorimer and Paul Spong
  - Trombone by Neil Sidwell and Annie Whitehead
  - Bass trombone by Dave Stewart
  - French horn by Nigel Black, Dave Lee, and Michael Thompson
  - Orchestral percussion by Frank Ricotta
- Track 5: baritone saxophone and assistant arrangement by Simon Clarke; French horn by Tim Jones

=== Production ===
- Produced by Marius de Vries with David Gray, Iestyn Polson, Craig McClune and Rob Malone
- Recorded and programmed by Iestyn Polson
- Mixed by Andy Bradfield
- Additional mix engineer/additional programming by Jason Boshoff
- Additional programming by Alexis Smith
- Track 1: orchestra arranged by Chris Elliott
- Track 2: orchestra arranged by David Nolte and Marius de Vries
- Track 5: horns arranged by Marius de Vries
- Track 7: strings arranged by Marius de Vries and Tim Bradshaw
- Mastered by Bob Ludwig
- Design and direction by Farrow Design
- Cover image concept by Red Design
- Cover photography by Joanna Thornhill
- Booklet photography by Phil Knott

== Charts ==
=== Weekly charts ===
Weekly chart performance for Life in Slow Motion
Chart (2005)	Peak position
Australian Albums (ARIA)	8
Austrian Albums (Ö3 Austria)	68
Belgian Albums (Ultratop Flanders)	26
Danish Albums (Hitlisten)	15
Dutch Albums (Album Top 100)	23
German Albums (Offizielle Top 100)	49
Irish Albums (IRMA)	1
Italian Albums (FIMI)	30
New Zealand Albums (RMNZ)	4
Norwegian Albums (VG-lista)	3
Swedish Albums (Sverigetopplistan)	14
Swiss Albums (Schweizer Hitparade)	19
UK Albums (OCC)	1
US Billboard 200	16

=== Year-end charts ===
2005 Year-end chart performance for Life in Slow Motion
Chart (2005)	Position
New Zealand Albums (RMNZ)	43
UK Albums (OCC)	23

2006 Year-end chart performance for Life in Slow Motion
Chart (2006)	Position
UK Albums (OCC)	195

== Certifications and sales ==
Certifications for Life in Slow Motion
Region	Certification	Certified units/sales
Australia (ARIA)	Gold	35,000^{^}
Ireland (IRMA)	4× Platinum	60,000^{^}
New Zealand (RMNZ)	Platinum	15,000^{^}
United Kingdom (BPI)	2× Platinum	759,861
United States	—	414,000
^{^} Shipments figures based on certification alone.
