= Sell, Sell, Sell =

Studio album by David Gray
- Released: 15 April 1996
- Recorded: September 1995–January 1996
- Genre: Indie rock, folk rock
- Length: 53:51
- Label: EMI
- Producer: David Gray

David Gray chronology
Flesh (1994)	Sell, Sell, Sell (1996)	White Ladder (1999)

Professional ratings
Review scores
Source	Rating
AllMusic	link
Alternative Press	3/5 stars

Sell, Sell, Sell is the third studio album by British musician David Gray, released in April 1996 by EMI. Two promotional-only singles were released: "Faster, Sooner, Now" and "Late Night Radio".

== Track listing ==
All tracks are written by David Gray.

No.	Title	Length
1.	"Faster, Sooner, Now"	2:23
2.	"Late Night Radio"	3:53
3.	"Sell, Sell, Sell"	5:11
4.	"Hold on to Nothing"	4:15
5.	"Everytime"	4:41
6.	"Magdalena"	4:24
7.	"Smile"	4:06
8.	"Only the Lonely"	4:46
9.	"What Am I Doing Wrong?"	5:01
10.	"Gutters Full of Rain"	4:22
11.	"Forever Is Tomorrow Is Today"	5:32
12.	"Folk Song"	5:15

== Credits ==
=== Musicians ===
- David Gray – vocals, guitars, keyboards and harmonica
- Craig McClune – drums, backing vocals and bass on "Hold on To Nothing"
- David Nolte – bass, lead guitars, piano, organ, etc., etc.
- Kristi Callan – backing vocals on "What Am I Doing Wrong?"

=== Production ===
- Recorded by Bryan Zee and Paul Kimble; except tracks 3, 10, and 11 recorded by Bob Salcedo and David Nolte, and track 12 recorded by Matt White.
- Mixed by Bob Salcedo and David Nolte.
- Mastered by Gavin Lurssen.
- Sleeve design by Mark Farrow Design.
- B&W photography by Rankin'. Colour photography by Sean Ash.
