= A Century Ends =

Studio album by David Gray
- Released: 12 April 1993
- Recorded: June–October 1992
- Genre: Folk rock
- Length: 47:24
- Label: Hut/Virgin (UK); Caroline (US)
- Producer: Dave Anderson

David Gray chronology
| A Century Ends (1993) | Flesh (1994) |

Singles from A Century Ends
- 1. "Birds Without Wings" Released: 16 November 1992; 2. "Shine" Released: 29 March 1993; 3. "Wisdom" Released: 14 June 1993

Professional ratings
Review scores
| Source | Rating |
|---|---|
| AllMusic | 3/5 stars |
| The New Rolling Stone Album Guide | 3.5/5 stars |

A Century Ends is the debut studio album by musician David Gray, released on 12 April 1993. Following the success of Gray's fourth album White Ladder, which sparked an interest in his back catalogue, A Century Ends was re-released in July 2001. Three singles were released from the album: "Birds Without Wings", "Shine" and "Wisdom."

== Critical reception ==
Trouser Press wrote that "Gray sings with equal parts sensitivity and vitality, emotional attributes that underscore the Van Morrison qualities of his tenor ... Excellent."

== Track listing ==
All tracks are written by David Gray.

| No. | Title | Length |
|---|---|---|
| 1. | "Shine" | 4:33 |
| 2. | "A Century Ends" | 5:08 |
| 3. | "Debauchery" | 3:27 |
| 4. | "Let the Truth Sting" | 5:30 |
| 5. | "Gathering Dust" | 6:43 |
| 6. | "Wisdom" | 4:15 |
| 7. | "Lead Me Upstairs" | 4:54 |
| 8. | "Living Room" | 3:44 |
| 9. | "Birds Without Wings" | 4:50 |
| 10. | "It's All Over" | 6:50 |

== Credits ==
=== Musicians ===
- David Gray – vocals, guitar
- Neil MacColl – guitar, mandolin, backing vocals
- Dave Anderson – piano, Wurlitzer electric piano, organ
- Mark Smith – bass
- Steve Sidelnyk – drums, percussion
- Mike Smith – saxophone

=== Production ===
- Produced by Dave Anderson
- Recorded by Jim Abbiss
- Mixed by Dave Anderson
- Photography by Robin Lewis Grierson
