= Chris Velan =

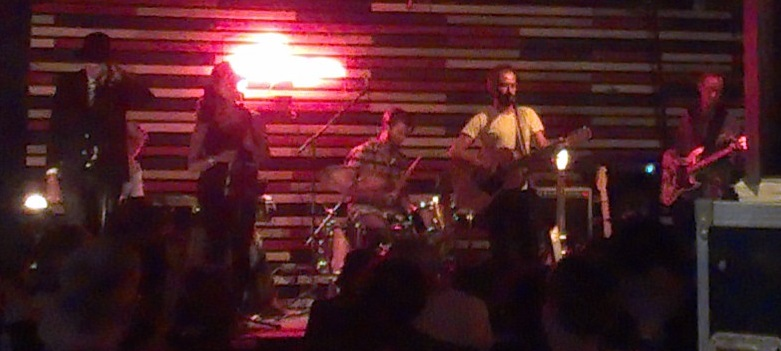
- Chris Velan & Friends' performance inside the Ritz PDB venue photographed in Montreal, Quebec, Canada.

Background information
- Origin: Montreal, Quebec, Canada
- Occupation(s): Singer-songwriter, guitarist
- Instrument: Guitar

Chris Velan is a Montreal-based singer-songwriter and guitarist.

== Career ==
While in college, he studied law. After passing the bar, he traveled to West Africa where he was the music producer of a documentary film about a group of refugee musicians from Sierra Leone.

In 2003 Velan returned from West Africa, releasing his debut solo album It's Not What You Think, which incorporated a mix of his old and new influences ranging from folk, pop and rock to world music and reggae.

Live, Velan uses a loop pedal which thickens and layers the music, as he performs live as a one-man band. His last album Solidago was released on NewSong Recordings. This is his third solo album and some of the artists featured on this album include San Francisco artists The Mother Hips, Animal Liberation Orchestra, Jackie Greene and Adam Topol (Culver City Dub Collective, Jack Johnson (musician).

== Influences ==
Velan's influences include Neil young, Cat Stevens, Robbie Robertson, Van Morrison and Mark Knopfler

Velan has been compared to artists including Tom Petty, Bob Dylan, and Jack Johnson. Due to his use of the loop pedal at his live performances, he has also been compared to KT Tunstall.

== Experience ==
Velan has performed with well-known acts across North America including:

Artist	Venue – Location
Duffy	Metropolis – Montreal, QC
ALO	Bowery Ballroom – New York, NY
Brett Dennen	Cafe Campus – Montreal, QC
Johnny Clegg	Metropolis – Montreal, QC
Corrine Bailey Rae	Mod Club – Toronto, ON

== Discography ==
Solo

- Songs About Songs – 19 May 2023
- Amateur Hour – 14 September 2018
- Glow – 2 March 2016
- The Long Goodbye – 23 July 2013
- Fables for Fighters – 7 June 2011
- Solidago – Released 7 April 2009
- Twitter, Buzz, Howl – 8 January 2007
- It's Not What You Think – 25 November 2003

With Equalizer

- Rise (1998) – Peter UnPlugged

As Producer

- Sierra Leone's Refugee All Stars -"Living Like a Refugee" (2006) – Anti- Records
