= David Gray (British musician) =

British singer-songwriter (born 1968)

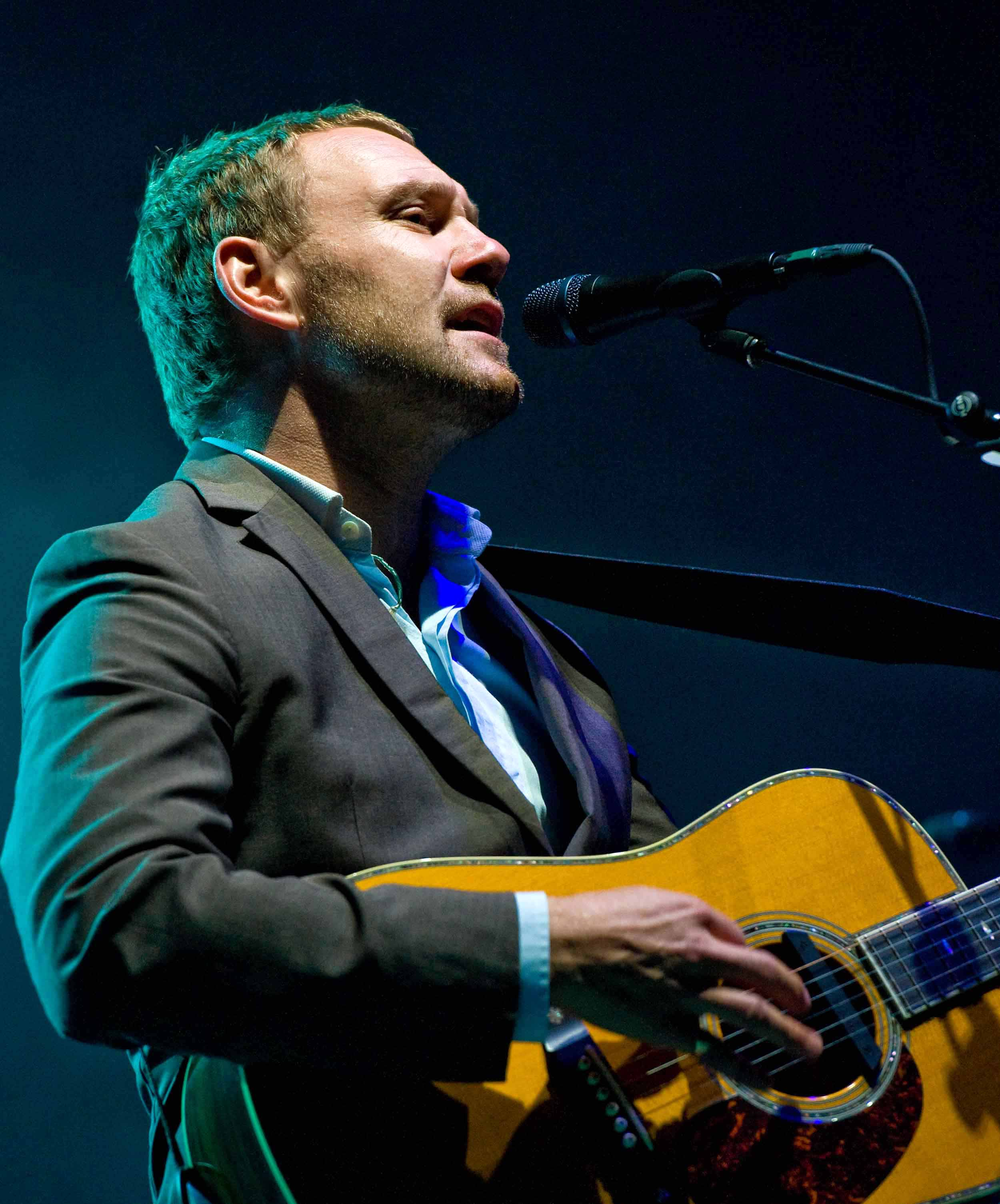
- Gray performing in 2010

Background information
- Born: David Peter Gray; 13 June 1968 (age 58); Sale, Cheshire, England
- Genres: Rock; alternative rock; folk rock; folktronica
- Occupations: Musician; songwriter; producer
- Instruments: Vocals; guitar; piano; keyboards; harmonica
- Years active: 1992–present
- Labels: Hut; IHT; Polydor; MapleMusic Recordings (Canada); Kobalt
- Website: davidgray.com

David Peter Gray (born 13 June 1968) is a British singer-songwriter. He released his debut album in 1993. Gray received worldwide attention upon the release of White Ladder and its hit single, "Babylon". White Ladder was the first of three chart-toppers in six years for Gray in the UK, and it became the fifth best-selling album of the 2000s there. In 2019, it was ranked as the UK's tenth best-selling album of the 21st century. Gray reached the US Top 20 with five successive albums. He has received four Brit Award nominations, including two nominations for Best British Male.

== Early life ==
David Gray was born in 1968 in Sale, Cheshire. He was born with pyloric stenosis, which is a narrowing of the opening from the stomach to the first part of the small intestine. He was initially misdiagnosed, and nearly died from starvation. He lived in Altrincham before moving with his family at the age of nine to Solva, Pembrokeshire, Wales, where his parents took over a gift shop and started a clothing business. "I had an amazing time growing up there ... My imagination could run wild ... It was that which gave me the kind of insane self-belief I have, and had even then, that I could do something as unlikely as play music for a living." He went to Ysgol Dewi Sant high school in nearby St Davids and then on to Carmarthenshire College of Art and finally Liverpool School of Art.

== Career ==
=== Early career ===
Gray's first two albums, A Century Ends and Flesh, were issued in 1993 and 1994, respectively. The albums made Gray popular in folk-rock circles, but failed in terms of commercial sales. Simon Price wrote of Gray's debut single, "Birds Without Wings": "He sounded like an anguished, intense troubadour, potentially a male PJ Harvey." In 1996, Gray released his third album, Sell, Sell, Sell.

=== White Ladder and rise to fame ===
Originally released on Gray's own label IHT Records in November 1998, White Ladder was re-released in 2000 on the Dave Matthews–owned ATO Records; it became a worldwide hit and made Gray a superstar. While his first three albums featured acoustic folk songs and guitar-based alternative rock, White Ladder introduced his now-trademark folktronic sound. The album included his best-known songs: "This Year's Love", "Babylon", "Please Forgive Me" and "Sail Away". After its re-release, combined with the release and success of single "Babylon", it sold 100,000 copies in Ireland alone, making it number one for six weeks, and according to a 2012 report was the biggest-selling album ever in that country. The album was No. 1 on the UK Albums Chart, two years and five months after its original release, spending a total of 151 weeks on the chart. Aside from "Please Forgive Me", which charted at No. 72 on the UK Singles Chart, all other single releases charted within the Top 20. In June 2000, the single "Babylon" hit No. 5 on the UK Singles Chart.

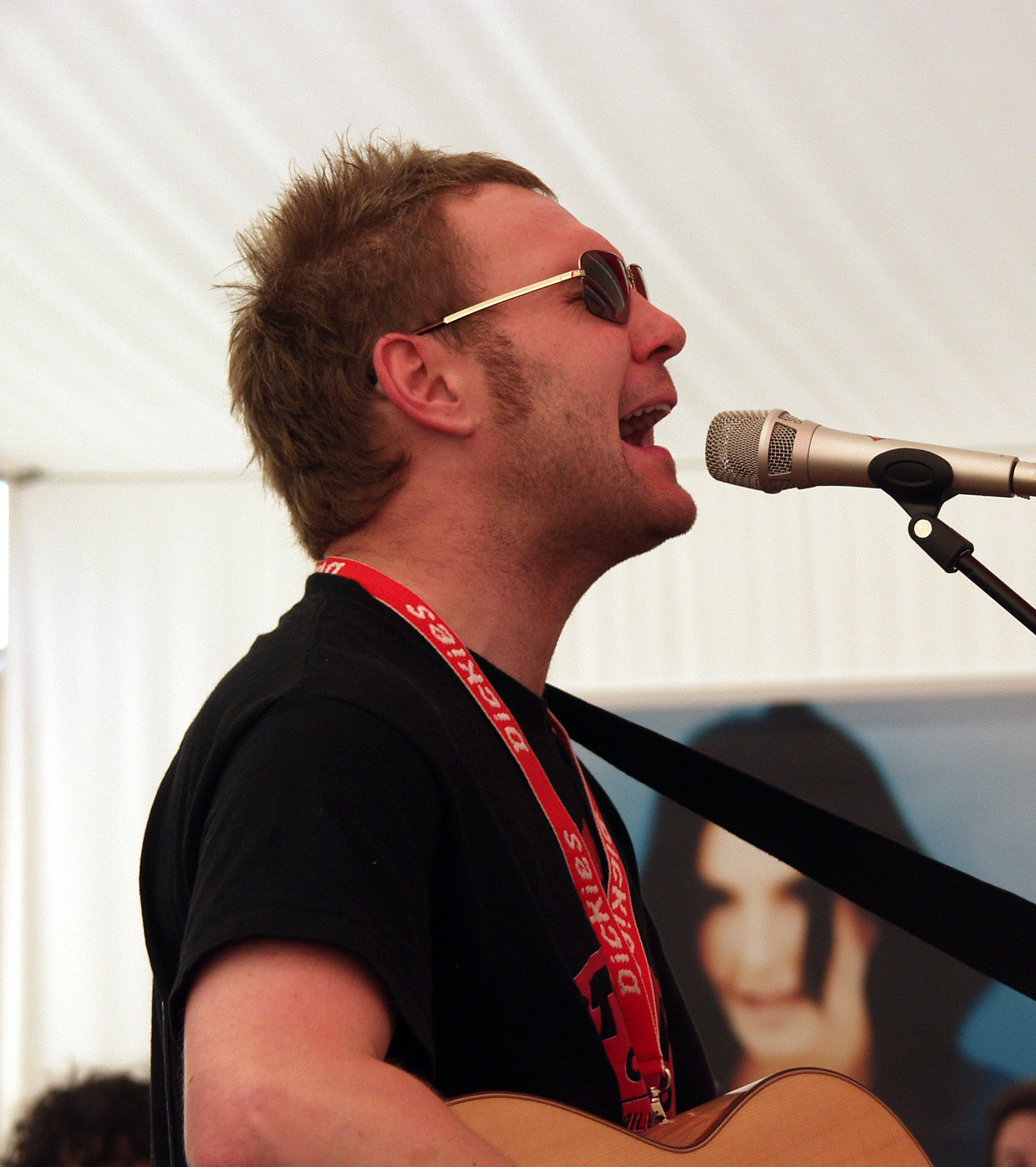
Gray performing an acoustic set on 17 August 2003

The year 2001 also saw the release of a rarities compilation of Gray's early works, The EPs 1992–1994, as well as an album of previously unreleased songs recorded in 1999, Lost Songs 95–98, both of which followed White Ladder into the Top 20 in the UK Albums Chart. Gray also provided vocals on the electronic-based band Orbital's 2001 single "Illuminate".

In November 2002, Gray released the follow-up to White Ladder, entitled A New Day at Midnight. The new release did not receive the same critical acclaim as its predecessor, but still went straight in at number 1, famously beating Pop Idol runner-up Gareth Gates's debut album What My Heart Wants to Say to the summit and selling nearly 150,000 copies in its first week of release. It went on to achieve platinum status within a year, eventually being certified four times platinum overall, and was the second-biggest selling album by a UK artist in 2002, behind Pop Idol winner Will Young's debut album From Now On. A New Day at Midnight produced two further UK Top 30 hits in "The Other Side" and "Be Mine" and a minor US hit with "Dead in the Water".

=== Later career ===
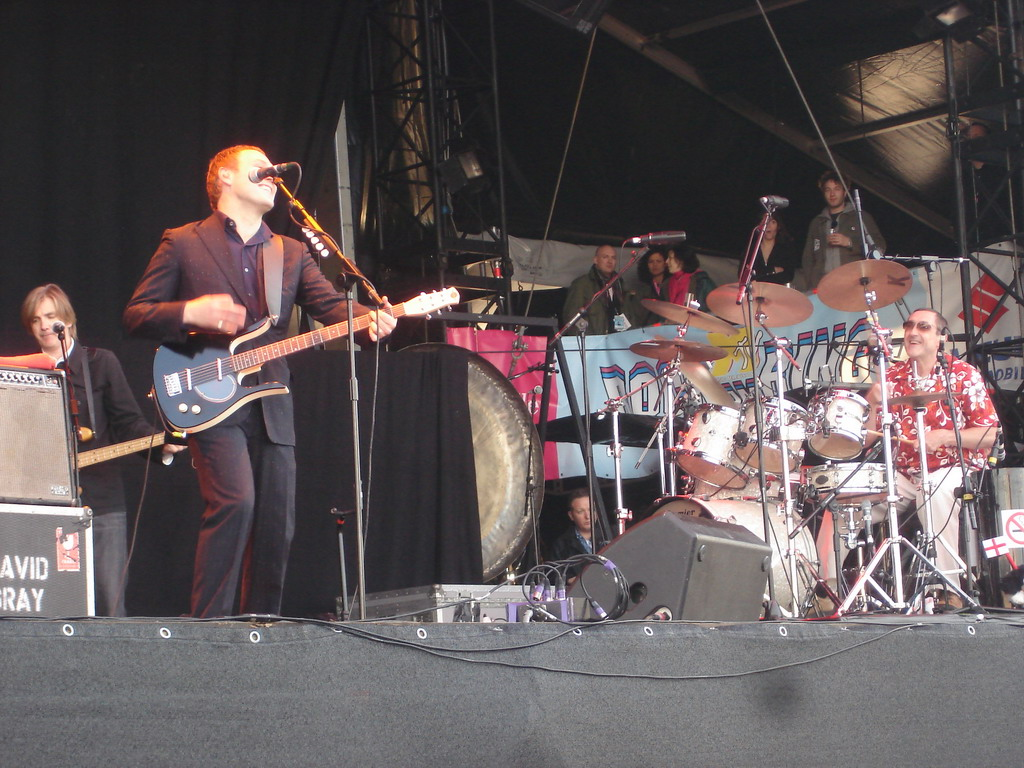
Gray and his band performing in 2006

After a three-year hiatus which saw him wind down his recording and touring schedule due to exhaustion, Gray returned with his seventh album, Life in Slow Motion, in September 2005. Like its predecessor, it topped the UK Albums Chart in its first week of release. After the much-criticised A New Day at Midnight, Life in Slow Motion was hailed as a return to form by many critics. Lead single "The One I Love" was a Top 10 hit in the UK in October 2005 and spent three months in the UK chart.

In March 2007, Gray released the compilation album Shine: The Best of the Early Years. On 7 July 2007, Gray performed with Damien Rice at the UK leg of Live Earth at Wembley Stadium in London. Gray released a compilation CD of live covers entitled A Thousand Miles Behind exclusively through his official website on 8 October that year on CD and digital download. On 13 November, Gray released the album Greatest Hits, which includes many of his best known songs as well as two new songs, including the lead single "You're the World to Me".

On 28 May 2009, Gray announced that his album Draw the Line would be released on 14 September in the UK and on 22 September in the United States. The album features guest appearances by Annie Lennox and Jolie Holland. The album's first single, "Fugitive", was released on 7 September 2009, coinciding with the start of an expansive world tour.

In an interview for Hot Press, released on 3 December 2009, Gray revealed to Jackie Hayden that he was working on his next album, Foundling. Gray said that one of the tracks would be called "The Old Chair", which, according to Gray, "features just a drum kit and me on my Steinway piano. It's very quiet." Foundling was released in the UK on 16 August. and in the United States on 17 August.

Gray signed a global agreement with Kobalt Label Services for the release of his 10th studio album, Mutineers. His first in four years, it was recorded at The Church Studios in London and produced by Andy Barlow (Lamb). The release took place on 17 June 2014. It was announced that Gray would support the new release with a North American tour through April and May, followed by an eight-date UK tour in June and July that included a show at the Royal Albert Hall in London.

The Best of David Gray was released on CD, double CD and LP in October 2016, and included two new recordings. The album, released in conjunction with IHT Records, had already been released as a dynamic playlist on Spotify that automatically changed shape every week. Gray commented: "What we have on our hands is an ever-evolving 'Best Of' that is different every week, every month, every year, every decade."

In March 2019, Gray released his 11th record, Gold in a Brass Age. It was produced by Ben de Vries, son of producer Marius de Vries, and was seen largely as a return to his signature "folktronica" sound.

In the year 2020, Gray released a 20th anniversary edition of White Ladder. A deluxe set with bonus tracks and demos was also made available on both CD and vinyl formats. He embarked on an international tour to celebrate the anniversary, starting in Europe in February, but it was cut short due to the COVID-19 pandemic.

Gray released his 12th studio album on 19 February 2021. Entitled Skellig (named after the Skellig Islands in County Kerry, Ireland) it featured a title track and a single called "Heart and Soul". It was recorded at Edwyn Collins' Helmsdale studio in Sutherland and features David Kitt, Rob Malone and producer Ben de Vries as musicians on the record.

== Discography ==
- A Century Ends (April 1993)
- Flesh (September 1994)
- Sell, Sell, Sell (August 1996)
- White Ladder (November 1998)
- Lost Songs 95–98 (July 2000)
- A New Day at Midnight (October 2002)
- Life in Slow Motion (September 2005)
- Draw the Line (September 2009)
- Foundling (August 2010)
- Mutineers (June 2014)
- Gold in a Brass Age (March 2019)
- Skellig (February 2021)
- Dear Life (January 2025)
- Nightjar (March 2026)

== Awards and nominations ==
BAFTA Awards

Year	Nominee / work	Award	Result	Ref.
2005	A Way of Life	Anthony Asquith Award for New British Composer	Nominated	

Brit Awards

Year	Nominee / work	Award	Result	Ref.
2001	Himself	British Male Solo Artist	Nominated	
2001	Lost Songs 95–98	British Album of the Year	Nominated	
2001	"Babylon"	British Single of the Year	Nominated	
2003	Himself	British Male Solo Artist	Nominated	

GQ Awards

Year	Nominee / work	Award	Result	Ref.
2002	Himself	Best Solo Artist	Won	

Grammy Awards

Year	Nominee / work	Award	Result	Ref.
2002	Himself	Best New Artist	Nominated	
2020	Gold in a Brass Age	Best Boxed or Special Limited Edition Package	Nominated	

Groovevolt Music and Fashion Awards

Year	Nominee / work	Award	Result	Ref.
2006	"From Here You Can Almost See the Sea"	Best Pop Deep Cut	Nominated	

IFPI Platinum Europe Awards

Year	Nominee / work	Award	Result	Ref.
2000	White Ladder	Album Title	Won	

Ivor Novello Awards

Year	Nominee / work	Award	Result
2001	"Please Forgive Me"	Best Contemporary Song	Nominated
2001	"Babylon"	Best Song Musically & Lyrically	Won
2002	"Sail Away"	Best Song Musically & Lyrically	Nominated
2003	"The Other Side"	Best Song Musically & Lyrically	Won

MTV Video Music Awards

Year	Nominee / work	Award	Result	Ref.
2001	"Babylon"	Best New Artist in a Video	Nominated	

MVPA Awards

Year	Nominee / work	Award	Result	Ref.
2002	"Please Forgive Me"	Best Adult Contemporary Video	Nominated	
2002	"Please Forgive Me"	Best Director of a Male Artist	Nominated	
2002	"Please Forgive Me"	Best Editing in a Video	Nominated	
2002	"Sail Away"	International Video of the Year	Nominated	

Meteor Music Awards

Year	Nominee / work	Award	Result
2001	White Ladder	Best International Album	Won
2001	Himself	Best International Songwriter	Won
2003	Himself	Best International Male	Nominated
2006	Himself	Best International Male	Nominated

My VH1 Music Awards

Year	Nominee / work	Award	Result	Ref.
2000	Himself	Best-Kept Secret	Nominated	
2000	Himself	Best UK Act	Nominated	

Pollstar Concert Industry Awards

Year	Nominee / work	Award	Result	Ref.
2001	Himself	Best New Artist Tour	Nominated	
2011	Himself	Most Creative Tour Package	Nominated	

Pop Factory Awards

Year	Nominee / work	Award	Result	Ref.
2002	A New Day at Midnight	Best CD Release	Nominated	

Q Awards

Year	Nominee / work	Award	Result
2000	"Babylon"	Best Single	Won
2003	Himself	Innovation in Sound	Nominated

Smash Hits Poll Winners Party

Year	Nominee / work	Award	Result	Ref.
2000	Himself	Best New Male Solo Star	Nominated	

== Personal life ==
Gray married his wife Olivia in Los Angeles, US in 1993, and together they have two daughters: He lives in London, having moved to Hampstead in 2009. Gray is also the brother-in-law of Phil Hartnoll of Orbital.

In 2011, a portrait of Gray was painted by Joe Simpson. The painting was exhibited around the UK, including at a solo exhibition at the Royal Albert Hall.

Gray is a Manchester United supporter. He said in 2005 that he is an atheist.

In 2024, Gray became an ambassador for the Wildfowl & Wetlands Trust.
