= And If You Will Come to Me =

Studio album by Idan Raichel
- Released: 31 January 2019
- Recorded: 2016–2019
- Genre: World
- Length: 36:12
- Language: Hebrew; Spanish; Amharic
- Label: Helicon; Cumbancha
- Producer: Idan Raichel

Idan Raichel chronology
Raichel – Piano – Songs (2017)	And If You Will Come to Me (2019)

And If You Will Come to Me (Hebrew: ואם תבואי אליי; Ve'Eem Tavo'ee Elay) is the second solo album by Israeli musician Idan Raichel. It was released on 31 January 2019, by Helicon in Israel and Cumbancha worldwide. The album features guest appearances by Zehava Ben, Danay Suárez, Berry Sakharof, Bombino, and Raichel's own Idan Raichel Project.

== Background and release ==
Raichel's first solo album, At the Edge of the Beginning, was released worldwide on 12 March 2016 and promoted with an international concert tour called Raichel - Piano - Songs, which was recorded and released as a live album in September 2017. The first single from And If You Will Come to Me, "Galgal Mistovev" (Spinning Wheel), was released on 14 January 2017, during the tour, reaching first place on Media Forest's weekly airplay chart. The second single, "Ahava Ka'zo" (A Love Like This), featuring Israeli singer Zehava Ben, was released on 3 May 2017 and attained first place on the chart.

The album's title track came out on 21 February 2018 as the third single and became one of Raichel's biggest hits, again reaching first place on Media Forest's weekly chart for two weeks and winning third place on the Israeli Annual Hebrew Song Chart. The album's international release was promoted by an international concert tour with guest appearances by members of The Idan Raichel Project.

== Track listing ==
No.	Title	Writer(s)	Length
1.	"Galgal Mistovev" (Spinning Wheel)	Idan Raichel	3:14
2.	"Ahava Ka'zo" (A Love Like This) (featuring Zehava Ben)	Raichel	4:45
3.	"Ve'Eem Tavo'ee Elay" (And If You Will Come to Me)	Raichel	3:33
4.	"La Eternidad Que Se Perdió" (The Eternity Was Lost) (featuring Danay Suárez)	Danay Suárez; Raichel	3:19
5.	"Beresheet" (In the Beginning)	Raichel	4:42
6.	"Lama Ze Magi'a Lanu" (Why Do We Deserve It) (featuring Berry Sakharof)	Raichel	3:26
7.	"Imidiwanine" (My Friends) (featuring Bombino)	Omara Moctar; Raichel	3:17
8.	"At Lo Nish'eret Levad" (You Are Not Left on Your Own)	Raichel	3:40
9.	"Ketero" (Let's Meet) (featuring The Idan Raichel Project)	Abebe Melese; Raichel	3:42
10.	"Ve'Eem Tavo'ee Elay" (And If You Will Come to Me) (Piano Version)	Raichel	2:34
Total length:			36:12
