= The Tel Aviv Session =

2012 studio album by the Touré-Raichel Collective

Studio album by The Touré-Raichel Collective
- Released: 2012
- Studio: Zitrin Studio
- Genre: World music
- Length: 63:46
- Label: Cumbancha
- Producer: Idan Raichel

The Touré-Raichel Collective chronology
The Tel Aviv Session (2012)	The Paris Session (2014)

The Tel Aviv Session is the first album by the Touré-Raichel Collective, a collaboration between Vieux Farka Touré from Mali and Idan Raichel from Israel. The project includes Israeli bassist Yossi Fine and Malian calabash player Souleymane Kane. It was released on 27 March 2012 on Cumbancha records. The album features contributions from Yankale Segal, Frédéric Yonnet, Cabra Casay, and Mark Eliyahu. It received acclaim, with reviewers praising the duo's ability to "complement each other phenomenally, with Raichel almost improving the sound of Farka Touré's guitar and the Malian doing the same to the Israeli's keyboards."

== Track listing ==
1. "Azawade" 08:12
2. "Bamba" 05:59
3. "Experience" 06:21
4. "Alkataou" 05:03
5. "Hawa" 07:00
6. "Kfar" (feat. Yankale Segal) 04:26
7. "Touré" (feat. Frédéric Yonnet) 04:06
8. "Le Niger" 07:59
9. "Ai Houde Bakoi" 02:47
10. "Ane Nahatka" (feat. Cabra Casay) 03:38
11. "Alem" (feat. Mark Eliyahu) 08:15
