= Idan Raichel =

Israeli musician (born 1977)

Idan Raichel עידן רייכל
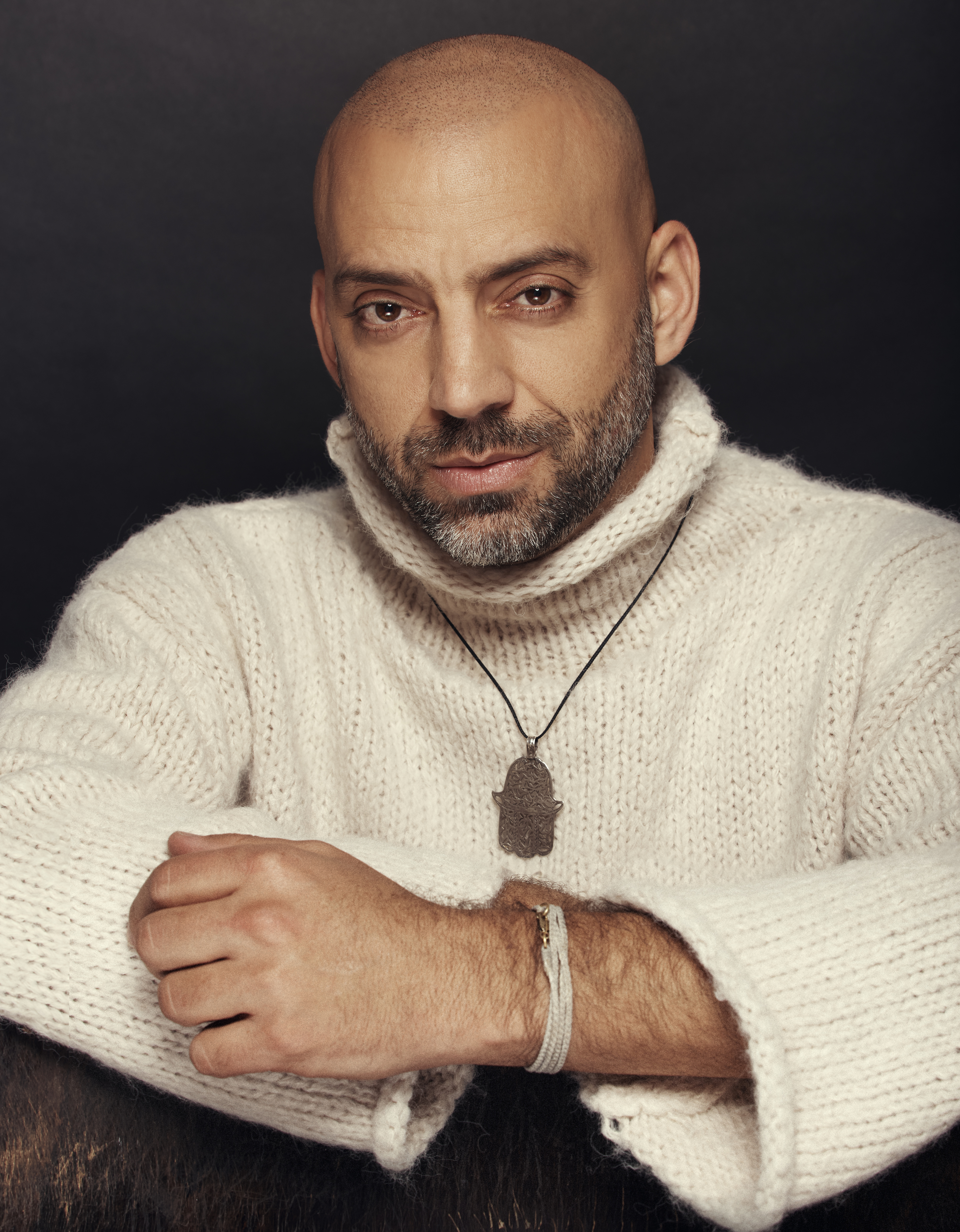
- Raichel in 2024

Background information
- Born: 12 September 1977 (age 49)
- Origin: Kfar Saba, Israel
- Genres: Pop; folk; world music
- Occupations: Musician; producer; composer
- Instruments: Vocals; piano; accordion
- Label: Helicon Records
- Website: idanraichelproject.com/en

Idan Raichel (Hebrew: עידן רייכל, IPA: [(ʔ)iˈdan ˈʁaiχel]; b. 12 September 1977) is an Israeli singer-songwriter and musician known for his "Idan Raichel Project" (Hebrew: הפרויקט של עידן רייכל), distinctive for its fusion of electronics, traditional Hebrew texts, and diverse musical influences. Prior to the project, Raichel was a keyboardist, collaborating with artists such as Ivri Lider.

== Biography ==
Idan Raichel was born in Kfar Saba, Israel, to an Ashkenazi Jewish family. He began to play the accordion at the age of nine. He was attracted to gypsy music and tango, and studied jazz piano in high school.

Raichel played in the Israel Defense Forces army band at the age of 18, performing covers of Israeli and Western pop hits at military bases around the country. As the musical director of the band, he learned to do arrangements and produce live shows.

Following his military service, Raichel worked as a counselor at Hadassim, a boarding school for immigrants. There he met young Ethiopian Jews who took him to Ethiopian bars and clubs in Tel Aviv and introduced him to Ethiopian folk and pop music, including that of Mahmoud Ahmed, Aster Aweke, and Gigi.

Raichel has three children with his wife, Damaris Duebel.

== Music career ==
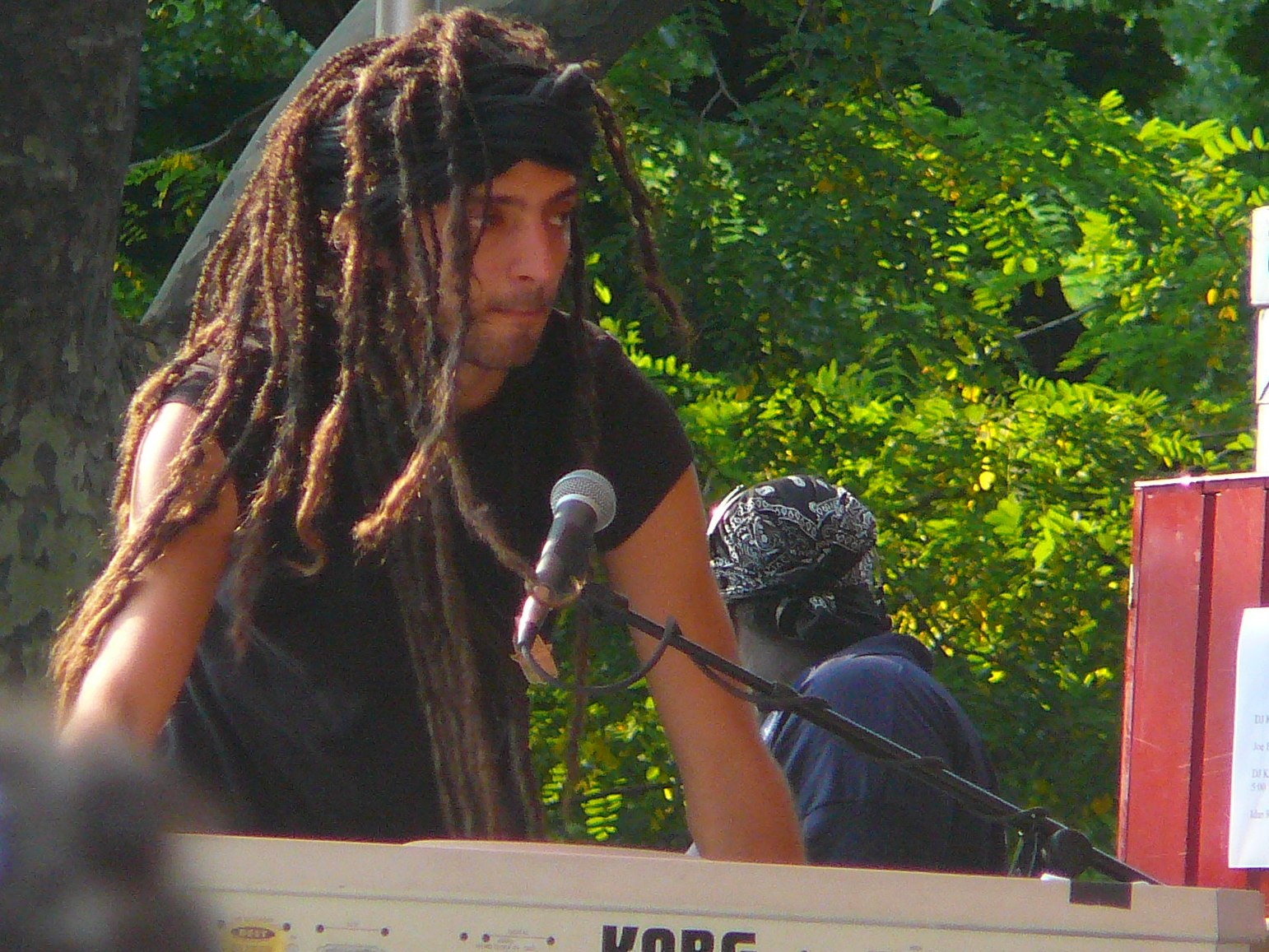
Idan Raichel performing at the Central Park SummerStage, June 2007

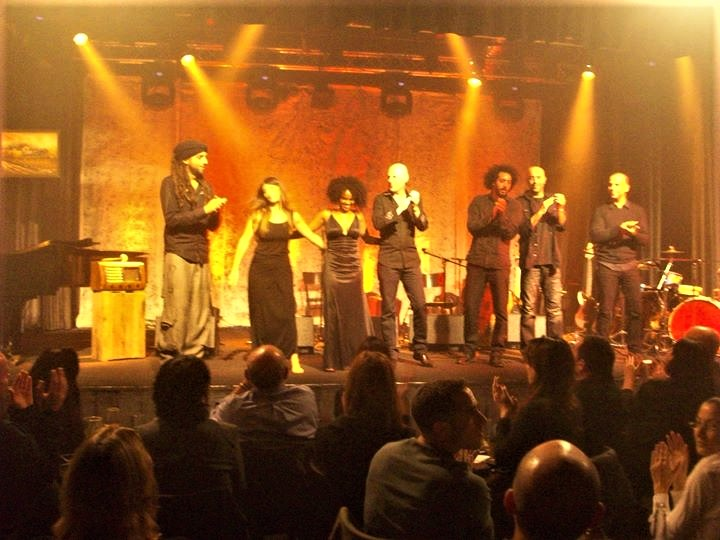
The Idan Raichel Project in concert in Tel Aviv, January 2011

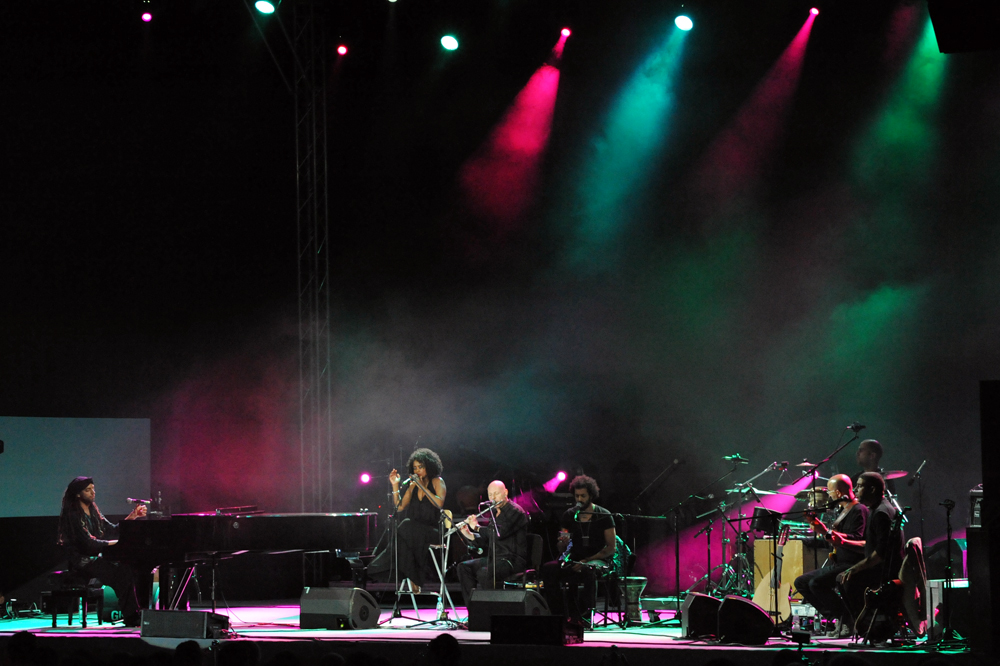
The Idan Raichel Project in concert in Warszaw, September 2011

After working as a backup musician and recording with some of Israel's most popular singers, Raichel struck out on his own. He began working on a demo recording in Kfar Saba and invited other singers and musicians to collaborate with him to create a new synthesis of sounds and styles. He released two albums locally before signing an international deal.

=== The Idan Raichel Project and Mi'Ma'amakim ===
The diversity of the Jewish diaspora and Israeli citizenry interested Raichel and influenced his musical career. He has worked with Ethiopian Jews, Arabs, traditional Yemenite vocalists, a toaster and percussionist from Suriname, and a South African singer, among others. The global fusion sound of the song "Bo'ee" ("Come with Me") propelled his group to the top of the charts. The Idan Raichel Project's self-titled first album focuses on these cross-cultural collaborations. It was released in Israel in 2002 and followed by a second album, Out of the Depths, in 2005.

This collaboration became a platform for the emergence of ethnic singers such as Cabra Casay, an Ethiopian Jew born in a refugee camp in Sudan, and Ravid Kahalani, from the band Yemen Blues, who explores his Yemenite roots. The Yemenite-Israeli singer Shoshana Damari performed with the group just before she died in 2006 at the age of 86. The Idan Raichel Project has released four albums as well as a collection of live recordings in Israel on the Helicon Label. Cumbancha, a US-based record label, released the group's first album worldwide in 2006. The album also received a nomination for Award for World Music by BBC Radio 3.

=== Within My Walls, Open Door ===
The Idan Raichel Project issued its second international release, Within My Walls, in 2008. Raichel recorded much of this album while he was on tour in impromptu settings. During his travels, he met musicians from around the world and exchanged musical ideas with them along the way. He recorded and co-wrote songs with Colombian singer Marta Gómez, Cape Verdean Mayra Andrade, and Rwandan/Ugandan Somi. The group performed at a number of international festivals and traveled to and performed across Europe, South and Central America, Asia, and Africa.

Raichel later worked with Grammy Award winner India.Arie on a project called Open Door. They began working together in 2008 when India was visiting Israel. Together, they performed at the Kennedy Center in Washington, DC in front of President Barack Obama on Martin Luther King Jr. Day after Obama's election. They also played the song "Gift of Acceptance" at the 2010 Nobel Peace Prize gala event. In August 2011, the duet performed at the dedication ceremony for the Martin Luther King Jr. Memorial in Washington, D.C., on their US tour. Raichel and India.Arie produced Arie's first single, "6th Avenue", from her 2013 album Songversation. Shimon Peres, then-president of Israel, asked Raichel to compose music for a poem Peres wrote about Israel's Ethiopian community.

=== Quarter to Six ===
The project's next album, Reva LaShesh ("Quarter to Six"), was released in 2013. It includes guest appearances by Portuguese fado star Ana Moura, Palestinian-Israeli singer Mira Awad, German countertenor Andreas Scholl, Colombia's Marta Gómez, Vieux Farka Touré, and some of Israel's up-and-coming artists. Quarter to Six reached triple-platinum sales status in Israel, selling over 116,000 copies.

The Project played at a private concert for President Barack Obama during his visit to Israel in March 2013. Raichel was invited by pop star Alicia Keys to perform a duet with her on stage at the Nokia Stadium in Tel Aviv. One month later, Raichel shared the stage with Patrick Bruel. At the end of the Jewish year in September, Pnai Plus, an Israeli entertainment magazine, voted Idan Raichel "Man of the Year". The song "Ba'Layla (At Night)" was voted "Song of the Year". Raichel was also named "Musician of the Year" in 2013 and 2014 by Galgalatz radio station. The Idan Raichel Project placed no.1 in Media Forest's chart of "The Most Broadcast Group" in Israel for 2013 and 2014, as well as "Group of the Year" in various media charts for 2014.

In September 2014, Alicia Keys invited Raichel and Palestinian singer and qanun player Ali Amr to join her on stage at the Global Citizen Festival in New York's Central Park to perform her song "We Are Here". On 3 July 2014, Raichel and 18 members of his project performed at Yarkon Park, Tel Aviv, in front of 20,000 people

On 12 January 2015, Raichel joined Patrick Bruel and Moroccan singer Youness El Guezouli on stage at the Paris Opera to sing "Pourquoi ne pas y croire..." (Why Not Believe) in French, Arabic, and Hebrew In 2015, Raichel continued to perform and collaborate with various musicians, including Italian singer Ornella Vanoni, Cuban singer Danay Suarez, and Portuguese singer Antonio Zambujo. He also toured extensively, including December 2015 shows in Japan with the Project, a series of concerts in Germany with Andreas Scholl, and an appearance at the Jazz a la Villette festival in Paris with The Touré-Raichel Collective in September 2015.

=== The Touré-Raichel Collective ===
Raichel incidentally met Vieux Farka Touré, son of Ali Farka Toure, at an airport in 2008. Toure was invited to Israel to perform at the Tel Aviv Opera House with Raichel in 2010, and this led to the formation of The Touré-Raichel Collective, a collaboration of Malian and Israeli musicians. The collective recorded an album together, The Tel Aviv Session, which reached the number one spot on the iTunes World Music sales charts and made number 2 on the Billboard World Music Chart. In September 2014, The Touré-Raichel Collective released their second album, The Paris Session, with Daby Touré on bass, Israeli trumpeter Niv Toar, Malian singer Seckouba Diabate, and others.

In November 2014, Raichel toured the United States and Canada alongside Vieux Farka Touré with the Touré-Raichel Collective. Their performance at Symphony Space in New York City, presented by World Music Institute, was previewed in a feature article in The New York Times, where music critic Larry Rohter described the Touré-Raichel Collective as "one of the most fruitful and intriguing collaborations in the grab-bag genre known as world music." While in New York, The Touré-Rachel Collective also appeared on WNYC radio's Soundcheck.

=== At the Edge of the Beginning ===
On 22 January 2016, Raichel's first solo album, At the Edge of the Beginning, was released worldwide. Raichel followed this with a set of solo piano concerts titled "Idan Raichel – Piano – Songs". He also toured with the Idan Raichel Project and with "Idan Raichel - Piano Concert with Friends" throughout Europe and the US. In February 2016, he performed at the Konzerthaus in Vienna.

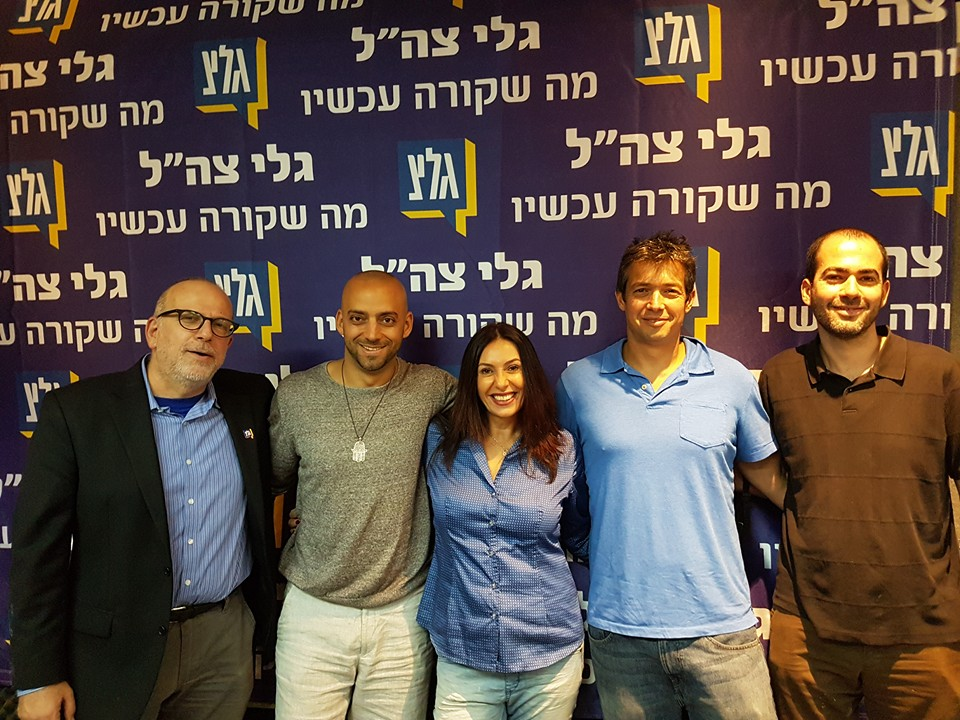
Raichel at Galei Tzahal radio Station, 2016 Left to right: Yaron Deckel, Idan Raichel, Miri Regev, Yoaz Hendel, Asael Lubotzky

=== 2017–2018 ===
January 2017 saw the release of the single "Spinning Wheel", followed in May by "A Love Like This", for which Raichel chose Zehava Ben as the vocalist.

In February 2017, just before Raichel set off on another long tour of performances in Europe and the US, there was a gala evening at the Tel Aviv Museum of Art to celebrate the museum's flagship exhibition "Regarding Africa – Contemporary Art and Afro-Futurism". During the evening, Raichel was presented with a special award in recognition of his contribution to bringing people together through music.

At the same time, the "Raichel – Piano – Songs" tour became a huge success. The show, in which Raichel at last realised his dream of getting close up to his audience and presenting his songs in their original format of piano and voice, stretched into 150 shows in Europe, the US, South America, and Israel, where it ran for 17 successive dates at the Shuni Amphitheater.

Raichel recorded all the shows at Shuni and selected the best and the most moving of the recordings, giving rise to a new 36-track live album, Raichel – Piano – Songs, which included new versions of some of his biggest hits as well as songs which he had composed for other artists.

The new album was released in September 2017 and the tour was rounded out with a series of shows at the Shuni Amphitheater in October 2017. In June 2018, the album was certified Gold.

The Latin Grammy Awards ceremony was held in November 2017, and amongst the nominees for "Album of the Year" was Danay Suárez's album Palabras Manuales, which included a version of the Cuban singer and Raichel dueting on a new version of "Closer Now" from the album Quarter to Six.

In February 2018, Raichel released a single called "And If You'll Come to Me". The song was produced cooperatively with musical producer Noam Akrabi.

In May 2018, Raichel released the single "Beresheet". The song was written during his travels around the world and inspired by his encounters with people from India and Africa. The song is accompanied by a music video showcasing sand artist Ilana Yahav.

In June 2018, there was a multidisciplinary festival, Raichel's brainchild, at the Live Park Amphitheater in Rishon LeZion. This ten-day festival featured a blend of music, food, and art alongside a few special appearances by The Idan Raichel Project in their new lineup. Within the framework of the festival, there was a culinary area under the direction of chef Yuval Ben Neriah, an exhibition of photographs by Ziv Koren, and a stage for performances by musicians such as SHIRAN, Di Gasen Trio, Quarter to Africa, Yossi Fine, and others.

=== 2019–present: And If You Will Come to Me ===
Raichel released his second solo studio album, And If You Will Come to Me, on 31 January 2019. The record reflected the next phase in a personal journey that began three years before, when Raichel put the Idan Raichel Project, at the time a 14-piece band, on hiatus and began performing more intimate solo and small-ensemble concerts.

Along with guest musicians from Japan, Bulgaria, Ethiopia, Cuba, and India, And If You Will Come to Me features duets with Nigerien guitar player Bombino, Cuban Grammy nominee Danay Suarez, Israeli stars Berry Sakharof and Zehava Ben, and a new studio track with the reunited Idan Raichel Project.

The album's title track, "Ve'Eem Tavo'ee Elay" (in Hebrew), became one of Raichel's biggest hits in Israel, with 20 million streams on YouTube alone, and the singles from the album have racked up a total of 35 million YouTube plays. Raichel supported the release of the album with four arena shows in Tel Aviv, followed by an extensive international tour in March 2019, including shows in France, Germany, the Netherlands, Austria, Italy, Switzerland, and the US.

On 18 May 2019, the Idan Raichel Project played at the Grand Final of the 2019 Eurovision Song Contest. A year later, in 2020, he cowrote, with Doron Medalie, the song "Feker Libi", recorded by Eden Alene. The song was to represent Israel in the Eurovision Song Contest 2020; the event was cancelled, however, due to the COVID-19 pandemic.

== Musical style ==
Raichel's style has Middle-Eastern influences but also draws on Latin American and African music. While the majority of his songs are in Hebrew, a few are entirely in Arabic or Spanish, while others include small passages in Amharic, by male and female voices, setting traditional-sounding tunes to modern music. Love songs predominate in his Hebrew lyrics, including "Hinech Yafah" (הינך יפה / "Thou Art Fair"), based on the Song of Songs. Another of his songs, "B'rachot L'shanah Chadashah" (ברכות לשנה חדשה / "Blessings for a New Year"), is sourced from Jewish liturgy, with voices reciting traditional Jewish blessings.

== Awards and recognition ==
On 16 January 2014, ACUM announced that Idan Raichel had won the ACUM Prize as Composer of the Year 2013 for Quarter to Six. On 1 November 2014, Raichel received the MTV role model award, introduced by Alicia Keys. On 8 May 2016, he received the 2016 "Unsung Hero Award" from the Drum Major Institute. The award was conferred by Martin Luther King III. This was the first time the organization had granted the award to a non-US citizen. On 6 June 2016, Raichel was awarded an honorary fellowship at the Israel Museum: "Idan's creative commitment to cross-cultural connections very much reflects the museum's own commitment to the singular power that is achieved by recognizing the ways that all things connect across time and geography, merging local and universal cultural strains to achieve global expression". On 7 July 2016, Raichel received a special citation from B'nai B'rith International: "The international musical cooperations that Raichel has created throughout his career have turned him into a cultural ambassador for millions of fans, representing a world full of hope in which musical collaborations remove boundaries between people coming from different backgrounds and cultures". In 2020, Raichel was chosen to light the Independence Day torch.

On 30 May 2021, Raichel was awarded an honorary doctorate from Bar-Ilan University for his contribution to the world of Israeli and international music. Professor Arie Zaban, president of the university, said in a conversation with Raichel: "We are honored to present you with an honorary doctorate. The degree is awarded to you in appreciation for, and recognition of, your work and unique contribution to Israeli music. Integrating diverse cultural layers is the hallmark of your work, and you have demonstrated an ability to integrate a wide variety of people in the projects that you lead."

== Views and opinions ==
Raichel has expressed the view that real peace can come when people understand and learn about each other's culture.

The artist used his Instagram account to defend Doron Zahavi (code name: Captain George), a former interrogator for Unit 504 of the Israeli Military Intelligence, who was accused of using torture and sodomy in the process of interrogating Mustafa Dirani. In this context, Raichel wrote, "I really don't care how 'George' extracted information", adding that "instead of receiving a medal of valor, he must now defend his name. This is a disgrace."

In 2013, Raichel expressed his view that Israeli artists have a duty to play an active role in public relations for the Jewish state. He also asserted that Israeli conscientious objectors are at the very bottom of Israeli society.

In a 2015 interview in Yedioth Ahronoth, Raichel was asked about this and said: "If you have a daughter and someone kidnapped her, you investigate that someone and your child's life is at risk. If she is my daughter, I would do whatever necessary to know where she is and to get the information that would save her life. Regardless if that someone is Muslim, Jewish or Christian. It is an example of unnecessary harsh criticism. The intention of the thing was taken out of context."

In December 2015, the musician took part in "Let's Speak More Music", a UN project called "United Pianos", in which eleven renowned pianists from all across the globe collaborated to play Sergei Prokofiev's Peter and the Wolf. The goal of the video was "to promote tolerance and unity through music."

In May 2025, Raichel shared the stage with Sagui Dekel-Chen, a former hostage captured by Hamas during the October 7 attacks, at Tel Aviv's Hostages Square.

== Discography ==
=== Studio albums ===
Title	Album details	Peak chart positions	Israel certificate	Sales
Title	Album details	US World	Israel certificate	Sales
The Idan Raichel Project (with The Idan Raichel Project)	Released: December 2002; Label: Helicon; Formats: CD, LP, digital download, streaming	—	5× Platinum	150,000+
The Idan Raichel Project Bonus Tracks (with The Idan Raichel Project)	Released: November 2004; Label: Cumbancha; Formats:	—		
Mi'ma'amakim (with The Idan Raichel Project)	Released: 20 January 2005; Label: Helicon; Formats: CD, digital download, streaming	—	3× Platinum	140,000+
Within My Walls (with The Idan Raichel Project)	Released: 30 November 2008; Label: Helicon, Cumbancha; Formats: CD, digital download, streaming	4	3× Platinum	120,000+
The Tel Aviv Session (as part of The Touré-Raichel Collective)	Released: February 2012; Label: Cumbancha; Formats: CD, LP, digital download	2		
Quarter to Six (with The Idan Raichel Project)	Released: March 2013; Label: Helicon, Cumbancha; Formats: CD, digital download, streaming	9	4× Platinum	120,000+
The Paris Session (as part of The Touré-Raichel Collective)	Released: 30 September 2014; Label: Cumbancha; Formats: CD, digital download, streaming	—		
At the Edge of the Beginning	Released: 3 December 2015; Label: Helicon, Cumbancha; Formats: CD, LP, digital download, streaming	3	Platinum	40,000+
And If You Will Come to Me	Released: 30 January 2019; Label: Helicon, Cumbancha; Formats: CD, digital download, streaming	—		
Migdal Shel Or	Released: 6 February 2024; Label: Helicon; Formats: Digital download, streaming	—		
Ad Sof Ha-Olam	Released: 12 September 2025; Label: Helicon; Formats: Digital download, streaming	—		

=== Compilation albums ===
Title	Album details	Peak chart positions	Israel certificate	Sales
Title	Album details	US World	Israel certificate	Sales
The Idan Raichel Project (with The Idan Raichel Project)	Released: 7 November 2006; Label: Cumbancha; Formats: CD, digital download	—		

=== Live albums ===
Title	Album details	Peak chart positions	Israel certificate	Sales
Title	Album details	US World	Israel certificate	Sales
Raichel – Piano – Songs	Released: 7 November 2006; Label: Cumbancha; Formats: CD, digital download	—	Gold	15,000+
Traveling Home (with The Idan Raichel Project)	Released: 14 July 2011; Label: Helicon, Cumbancha; Formats: CD, digital download, streaming	—	2× Platinum	80,000+

== See also ==
- Music in Israel
