= Quarter to Six =

2013 studio album by the Idan Raichel Project

Studio album by The Idan Raichel Project
- Released: March 2013
- Recorded: January 2009 – January 2013
- Genre: World
- Language: Hebrew; German; Portuguese; Arabic; French; Spanish
- Label: Helicon; Cumbancha
- Producer: Idan Raichel; Gilad Shmueli

The Idan Raichel Project chronology
Traveling Home (2011)	Quarter to Six (2013)

Quarter to Six (Hebrew: רבע לשש; Reva Le'Shesh) is the fourth studio album by Israeli music group The Idan Raichel Project. It was released in March 2013 by Helicon in Israel and Cumbancha worldwide. The album features guest appearances by Andreas Scholl, Tamir Nachshon, Anat Ben Hamo, Idan Haviv, Ana Moura, Mira Awad, Vieux Farka Touré, Amir Dadon, Marta Gómez, Shai Tsabari, Liat Zion, and Ishay Ribo. It peaked at ninth place in Billboard's World Albums chart. In 2015, the album was certified 4× platinum in Israel, selling 120,000 copies.

== Track listing ==
No.	Title	Performer(s)	Length
1.	"Yored Ha'Erev" (Evening Falls)	Idan Raichel	2:20
2.	"In Stiller Nacht" (In a Quiet Night)	Andreas Scholl	3:51
3.	"Achshav Karov" (Closer Now)	Tamir Nachshon	3:43
4.	"Rak Oto" (Only Him)	Anat Ben Hamo	2:36
5.	"Ba'Layla" (At Night)	Idan Haviv	4:06
6.	"Sabe Deus" (God Knows)	Idan Raichel and Ana Moura	4:25
7.	"Ana Ana wa Enta Enta" (I Am What I Am)	Mira Awad	2:42
8.	"Ad She'Ein Yoter Le'an" (Until There's Nowhere Left)	Idan Raichel	5:05
9.	"Ha'Ru'ach Ha'Zo" (This Wind)	Idan Raichel	2:54
10.	"Mon Amour" (My Love)	Vieux Farka Touré	2:56
11.	"Chaim Pshutim" (Simple Life)	Amir Dadon	3:10
12.	"Olam Shalem" (A Whole World)	Idan Raichel	3:14
13.	"Detrás De Mi Alma" (Behind My Soul)	Marta Gómez	3:15
14.	"Bekarov" (Soon)	Shai Tsabari	3:02
15.	"Im Ha'ita Ro'eh" (If You Would Have Seen)	Liat Zion	3:53
16.	"Or Ka'ze" (A Light Such As This)	Ishay Ribo	3:48

== Charts ==
Sales chart performance for Quarter to Six
Chart (2013)	Peak position
US World Albums (Billboard)	9

== Certifications ==
Region	Certification	Sales	Ref.
Israel (IFPI)	4× Platinum	120,000	
