= Within My Walls =

2009 studio album by the Idan Raichel Project

The Idan Raichel Project

Studio album by Idan Raichel
- Released: 24 February 2009 (US & Canada)
- Genre: World music
- Length: 43:43
- Label: Cumbancha

Idan Raichel chronology
The Idan Raichel Project (2006)	The Idan Raichel Project (2009)	Quarter to Six (2013)

Within My Walls is the third studio album by the Israeli ensemble the Idan Raichel Project. The album is the creation of songwriter, musician, and composer Idan Raichel, but the sound produced relies on a heavy collaboration of international artists that Idan brought in. Douglas Heselgrave, reviewing the album for The Music Box, wrote: "[The record is] a "mélange of styles that ranges from traditional Jewish folk songs to Ethiopian trance music, Raichel's compositions successfully balance the diverse influences of the gathered musicians to produce songs that succeed on their own terms."

== Track listing ==
1. "Todas Las Palabras" (2:56)
2. "Bein Kirot Beiti" (3:16)
3. "She'eriot Shel Ha'chaim" (3:05)
4. "Mai Nahar" (3:07)
5. "Chalomot Shel Acherim" (3:39)
6. "Odjus Fitxadu" (3:25)
7. "Shev" (3:50)
8. "Rov Ha'sha'ot" (4:01)
9. "Min Nhar Li Mshiti" (3:48)
10. "Cada Dia" (2:34)
11. "Hakol Over" (3:47)
12. "Nin'al Be'mabato" (2:54)
13. "Maisha" (3:21)

== Featured vocalists ==
- Mayra Andrade (Odjus Fitxadu)
- Maya Avraham (Shev)
- Anat Ben Hamo (Mai Nahar)
- Shimon Buskila (Min Nhar Li Mshiti)
- Amir Dadon (She'eriot Shel Ha'chaim)
- Ilan Damti (Rov Ha'sha'ot)
- Marta Gomez (Todas Las Palabras, Cada Dia)
- Somi (Maisha)
- Shai Tsabari (Nin'al Be'mabato)
