= Baro (album) =

Studio album by Habib Koité & Bamada
- Released: July 24, 2001
- Label: Contre-Jour & Putumayo

Habib Koité & Bamada chronology
Ma Ya (1998)	Baro (2001)	Foly! Live around the world (2004)

Baro is the third album by Habib Koité & Bamada. It includes a new Afro-Cuban version of his first commercial hit "Cigarette Abana", (originally found on his first album, Muso Ko).

== Track listing ==
1. "Batoumambe"
2. "Kanawa"
3. "Wari"
4. "Sin Djen Djen"
5. "Cigarette Abana (Baro Version)"
6. "Woulaba"
7. "Baro"
8. "Sambara"
9. "Roma"
10. "Tere"
11. "Mali Sadio"
12. "Takamba"
13. "Sinama Denw"
14. "Bonus Track"
