= Mi'ma'amakim =

2005 studio album by the Idan Raichel Project

Studio album by Idan Raichel
- Released: 20 January 2005
- Genre: World music
- Label: Helicon

Idan Raichel chronology
The Idan Raichel Project (2002)	Mi'ma'amakim (2005)	The Idan Raichel Project (International) (2006)

Mi'ma'amakim (Hebrew: ממעמקים / "Out of the Depths") is the second album by the Idan Raichel Project, released in 2005 in Israel.

The title track, reminiscent of the opening of Psalm 130 (traditionally recited by Jews in times of distress), gained significant airplay. The first and last tracks feature vocals by Shoshana Damari.

In addition to more catchy tunes in Hebrew and Amharic, the album includes vocals in Arabic ("Azini"), Zulu ("Siyaishaya Ingoma"), Hindi ("Milim Yafot Me'ele"), and Yemenite Hebrew.

== Track listing ==
1. "Aleh Nisa' Baru'ach" (2:48) עלה נישא ברוח
2. "Be'yom Shabat" (3:33) ביום שבת
3. "Shuvi El Beti" (3:54) שובי אל ביתי
4. "Yesh Bi Od Ko'ach" (3:09) יש בי עוד כוח
5. "Mi'ma'amakim" (5:50) ממעמקים
6. "Im Tachpetza" (3:59) אם תחפצה
7. "Milim Yafot Me'eleh" (4:46) מילים יפות מאלה
8. "Mikol Ha'ahavot" (4:22) מכל האהבות
9. "Ulai Hapa'am" (2:40) אולי הפעם
10. "Azini" (4:27) عزين
11. "Ein Li Terutsim" (3:16) אין לי תירוצים
12. "Siyaishaya Ingoma" (3:34)
13. "Ha'er Et Einav" (2:49) האר את עיניו

== Reception ==
The album was certified 3× Platinum in Israel.
