= Fio da Memória =

Studio album by Luísa Maita
- Released: September 23, 2016
- Genre: Samba; electronic; Latin; bossa nova; MPB
- Label: Cumbancha

Luísa Maita chronology
Lero-Lero (2010)	Fio da Memória (2016)

Fio da Memória (English: Threads of Memory) is the second studio album by Brazilian singer-songwriter Luísa Maita, released on September 23, 2016 through the independent label Cumbancha. The album is a slight shift in sound, aiming towards a more electronic-based style compared to Maita's previous album Lero-Lero; with Maita explaining, “I wanted to revisit the Brazilian rhythms and other sounds that I have heard growing up from a contemporary, electronic and urban perspective.”

== Track listing ==
No.	Title	Length
1.	"Na Asa"	3:16
2.	"Around You"	3:20
3.	"Olé"	4:08
4.	"Porão"	3:56
5.	"Fio da Memória"	3:12
6.	"Música Popular"	4:30
7.	"Ela"	4:24
8.	"Volta"	3:33
9.	"Sutil"	4:20
10.	"Folia"	3:36
11.	"Jump"	1:19
