= 6 (Hadag Nachash album) =

6 (Shesh)

Studio album by Hadag Nahash
- Released: February 2010
- Genres: Hip-hop, funk
- Length: 49:37
- Label: Hatav Hashmini
- Producer: Yossi Fine

Hadag Nahash chronology
Be'ezrat Ha'Jam (2006)	6 (Shesh) (2010)	Zman Lehit'orer (Time To Wake Up) (2013)

6 (Hebrew: שש; Shesh) is the sixth album and fifth studio album of Israeli hip-hop band Hadag Nahash. The album was released in February 2010 on the Eighth Note (HaTav HaShmini/התו השמיני) label under the production of Yossi Fine.

This is the band's first album to incorporate English onto some of their tracks, with which they are trying to expand their appeal and represent the situation in Israel to a wider audience. There is also a short Arabic clip on one of the tracks.

The song "Lo Maspik" from this album was re-recorded in the Simlish language of The Sims and is featured in The Sims 3: Late Night.

== Track listing ==
1. "Super Groove" (סופר גרוב)
2. "Ani Ma'amin" (אני מאמין) "I Believe"
3. "Lo Maspik" (לא מספיק) – "Not Enough"
4. "Shir Nechama" (שיר נחמה) – "Comfort Song"
5. "BaSalon Shel Solomon" (בסלון של סלומון) – "In Solomon's Living Room"
6. "Od Ach Echad" (עוד אח אחד) – "One More Brother"
7. "Little Man"
8. "Many Lights"
9. "Jambalaya"
10. "Ma'arbolet Shel Chol" (מערבולת של חול) – "Vortex of Sand"
11. "War"
12. "Super Groove" (סופר גרוב)
13. "That Ain't What It's All About"

== Personnel ==
- Sha'anan Streett – vocals
- Guy Mar – DJ, vocals
- David (Dudush) Klemes – keyboards
- Moshe "Atraf" Asaraf – drums
- Yair (Yaya) Cohen Harounoff – bass
- Shlomi Alon – saxophone, flute, vocals
- Yosi Fine – lead guitar, vocals, band manager, electric triangle
