= Maita Remixed =

Remix album by Luísa Maita
- Released: October 9, 2010 (US)
- Genre: Samba; electronic; DJ
- Label: Cumbancha

Luísa Maita chronology
Lero-Lero (2010)	Maita Remixed (2010)	Fio da Memória (2016)

Maita Remixed (2010) is the remixed version of Brazilian singer-songwriter Luísa Maita's first album on the independent label Cumbancha, Lero-Lero (2010). The album features remixes by DJs and producers from Brazil, the United Kingdom, and New York, including DJ Tudo, DJ/rupture, Popular Beat Combo, Tejo, Seiji, and Maga Bo. The album updates the bossa nova, samba, and MPB inspirations of her original album with a modern, electronic sound.

== Track listing ==
No.	Title	Length
1.	"Lero-Lero [DJ Tudo Remix]"	4:18
2.	"Fulaninha [Maga Bo Remix]"	3:42
3.	"Desencabulada [Popular Beat Combo Remix]"	2:36
4.	"Lero-Lero [DJ/Rupture Remix]"	3:19
5.	"Alento [Tejo Remix]"	4:18
6.	"Lero-Lero [Seiji Remix]"	5:26
7.	"Fulaninha [Da Lata Remix]"	6:07
8.	"Desencabulada [Intoccabile Remix]"	3:32
