= At the Edge of the Beginning =

Studio album by Idan Raichel
- Released: 12 March 2015
- Genre: World music
- Length: 31:49
- Language: Hebrew
- Label: Helicon; Cumbancha
- Producer: Idan Raichel; Gilad Shmueli

Idan Raichel chronology
Quarter to Six (2013)	At the Edge of the Beginning (2015)	And If You Will Come to Me (2019)

At the Edge of the Beginning is the first solo album by Israeli musician Idan Raichel. It was released on 12 March 2015 by Helicon and Cumbancha records.

== Background ==
All tracks are written and produced by Idan Raichel. "Circles" and "In Five Seconds" were produced in collaboration with Israeli drummer Gilad Shmueli. The track "Longing" is sung by Israeli singer Dana Zalah.

The album was certified gold even before being released. In 2018, it was certified platinum.

The album peaked at number three on Billboard's Top World Music Albums chart.

== Track listing ==
All tracks are written by Idan Raichel

No.	Title	Length
1.	"Le'Chakot (To Wait)"	3:07
2.	"Ha'Yad Ha'Chama (The Warm Hand)"	2:49
3.	"Ba'Yeshimon (In the Wilderness)"	2:27
4.	"Mabitim Ba'Yare'ach (Looking at the Moon)"	2:52
5.	"Ma'agalim (Circles)"	3:17
6.	"Ei Boded (Lonely Island)"	2:16
7.	"Yalda Shelli Ktana (Little Girl of Mine)"	2:15
8.	"Delet Mistovevet (Revolving Door)"	2:45
9.	"Ga'agva (Longing)"	2:45
10.	"Be'Chamesh Shniyot (In Five Seconds)"	3:15
Total length:		31:49

== Charts ==
Chart (2015–2016)	Position
US World Albums (Billboard)	3

== Certifications ==
Region	Certification	Sales	Ref.
Israel (IFPI)	Platinum	40,000	
