= The Touré-Raichel Collective =

International musical group

- Origin: Mali; Israel
- Genres: World; blues; jazz
- Years active: 2010–2014
- Labels: Cumbancha
- Website: toureraichel.com

The Touré-Raichel Collective was a musical group led by Malian singer and guitarist Vieux Farka Touré and Israeli singer and pianist Idan Raichel. The group's debut album, The Tel Aviv Session, was released on Cumbancha in March 2012.

== History ==
In 2008, after a chance meeting at an airport terminal in Berlin, Germany, Raichel and Touré forged a friendship with an intention to perform together in concert. This came to fruition in November 2010 with the duo performing at the Tel Aviv Opera House. The following day they entered a recording studio in Tel Aviv. Joining Vieux and Idan in the studio were Israeli bassist Yossi Fine and Malian Calabash player Souleymane Kane. According to Raichel, the group "recorded a mix of Malian rhythms mixed with Israeli melodies — all originals, but very influenced from both our cultures." This spontaneous and improvised acoustic recording session lasted for three hours and marked the birth of The Touré-Raichel Collective. The group's debut album, The Tel Aviv Session, was released by Cumbancha on March 27, 2012. The group toured in North America, with Amit Carmeli on bass, in March and April 2012. The Touré-Raichel Collective completed a European tour in Fall 2012 and another European tour is planned for Spring 2013.

The Touré-Raichel Collective released their second album, The Paris Session, in Fall 2014. This album was supposed to be recorded in Mali, but political and religious unrest prevented this from happening. Instead, they recorded in Paris, France, informing the name "The Paris Session". Songs on this album are sung in French, Bambara, Songhai, and Hebrew, blending the two men's traditions.

== Reception ==
The group has received largely enthusiastic critical reception. Derek Beres of The Huffington Post stated: “[The Touré-Raichel Collective] execute their craft so diligently and passionately that spontaneous improvising results in rich and symbolic gestures of art.” David Maine of PopMatters declared: "This is the best record you will hear this year."

The Tel Aviv Session reached the number one spot on the iTunes World Music sales charts and peaked at number 2 on the Billboard World Music Chart.

The Paris Session was also well received. The New York Times described their cover of Ali Farka Touré's (Touré's father) song "Diaraby", writing, "in place of the buzzing, riff-laden guitar dialogue of the original track, the Touré-Raichel version emphasizes the song’s crystalline melody and is performed as a simple duet for voice and piano." PopMatters described The Paris Session as, "engrossing, reflecting a more urban environment within the first song as you hear the warmth of a trumpet, instead of the pure desert vibes from the earlier album."

== Discography ==
- The Tel Aviv Session (2012)
- The Paris Session (2014)

== See also ==
- African fingerstyle guitar
- African music
- Music of Israel
