= Joseph Driscoll =

Joseph Driscoll may refer to:

- Joseph R. Driscoll (born 1970), American politician, member of the Massachusetts House of Representatives
- Joseph Driscoll (Canadian politician) (1876–1942), Canadian politician, municipal councillor in Edmonton
- Joe Driscoll (rapper) (born 1979), musician from New York
