= Novalima =

Peruvian band

- Origin: Lima, Peru
- Genres: Afro-Peruvian Music; Electronica; Latin American music
- Years active: 2001 – Present
- Labels: Mr Bongo Records, Cumbancha
- Members: Ramón Perez Prieto; Grimaldo Del Solar; Rafael Morales; Carlos Li Carrillo
- Website: www.novalima.net

Novalima is a Peruvian band. Novalima's style blends Afro-Peruvian music with Electronica, Latin American beats, and other contemporary genres.

Novalima is a Latin Grammy nominated band formed in 2001 by four childhood friends, with music based on afro-peruvian percussion and chants (many from times of slavery), mixed with influences from Dub Reggae, Electronic beats, funk, soul & afrobeat. As of 2021, Novalima has released 6 studio albums and 5 remix albums, and has toured extensively throughout the globe playing in the most prestigious festivals: Central Park Summer Stage, Chicago's Millennium Park, Montreal Jazz Fest, Womad, Womex, Roskilde Festival, amongst others.

== History ==
Novalima founders Ramón Perez Prieto (Lima), Rafael Morales (London), Carlos Li Carrillo (Hong Kong) and Grimaldo Del Solar (Barcelona), became friends while in high school in Lima, and shared a fascination for many types of music, such as metal, rock, reggae, dance and electronic music.

The production of the “Novalima” first album, and the “Afro” (2d album) was done when the main members were living in different parts of the world. From their homes in different countries they started emailing song ideas to each other even when transferring heavy song files was not easy in the internet and the files had to be done by courier in burned CDs. For the 2nd album, Afro, they invited more Afro-Peruvian musicians to join their recording sessions. It was released in 2006 to tremendous acclaim and put Novalima on the international music map. It also held the #1 spot on the US College Music Journal Latin Alternative and New World radio charts for ten weeks combined. On that same year Novalima was awarded with the IMA (The Independent Music Awards) for Best Album in World Fusion category.

In “Afro”, the creative core was further enriched by Afro-Peruvian scene musicians, such as Milagros Guerrero, Juan Medrano (Cotito), Mangue Vásquez and Marcos Mosquera.

Shortly after the world release of the “Afro” album and after playing drums in the 1st Novalima concert in Lima, Pier de Bernardi left the band and the production team. With the addition of percussionist/timbalero Constantino Álvarez to the band, Novalima started touring live concerts in Europe, USA and Asia.

Novalima's 3rd album, Coba Coba, was released in October 2008 for the Peruvian market. The album was released worldwide in January 2009 by the Cumbancha label and nominated for the Latin Grammy as Best Alternative Album. On Coba Coba, Novalima delved further into the African roots of Afro-Peruvian music, bringing in influences from its musical cousins reggae, dub, salsa, hip-hop, afrobeat and Cuban son. To complete the extensive Coba Coba tour, Alfonso Montesinos joined the band ensemble with the bass guitar since 2010.

In 2010, the song "Machete" from the album "Afro" appears in the film Machete.

In 2011 Novalima started the recordings of “Karimba”, its 4th album. One of the main guest musicians for this musical production is the singer Pepe Vasquez who is considered a legend in Perú music scene. Karimba was released in January 2012 under the label Eighteenth Street Lounge Music (ESL Music). Followed by Karimba Diabolic Remixes in 2013 under Wonderwheel Recordings (Brooklyn based label).

In mid 2012, Mangüé Vasquez died. Mangüé was considered the best Afro Peruvian “cajón” player in Perú, and the one who provided the initial Afro Peruvian influences to the band. He was widely recognized as the “soul” of Novalima.

The rest of the band continued touring worldwide with Novalima. In 2015 Novalima recorded its 5th album Planetario, which was reviewed very positively by NPR as a "three-layer cake of time" and avant-garde in approach and execution, released by Wonderwheel Recordings (NY Based Label) and also releasing Planetario remixes on 3 EP's in 2016. In 2017 they take a break from touring to get back recording in the studio.

By 2018, released Ch'Usay, 6th Album, eight tracks incorporating new andean influences with new featured artists from Peru, a Silvia Falcon, guest lyrics on native quechua language as well as local quechua rapper Liberato Kani among others, and collaborations with other fellow-artists around the world. Followed by the Chusay Remixes in 2019. The band continued touring live in Mexico and Panama during January and February 2020 until March global lockdown for COVID19.

== Discography ==
- Novalima, Novalima Music, 2003
- Afro, Mr. Bongo/UK, 2005
- Coba Coba, Novalima Music/Cumbancha, 2008
- Coba Coba Remixed, Novalima Music/Cumbancha, 2009
- Karimba, Eighteenth Street Lounge, 2012
- Karimba Diabolic Remixes, Wonderwheel Recordings, 2013
- Planetario (Wonderwheel Recordings), 2015
- Planetario Remixes EP's I, II & III (Wonderwheel Recordings), 2016-2017
- Son Palenque-Aloito Pio-Novalima Remix (Galletas Calientes Records), 2018
- Ch'usay (Wonderwheel Recordings), 2018
- Ch'usay Remixes (Wonderwheel Recordings), 2019
- "Shantallion" Novalima & Israel Vich - single (Sol Selectas), 2020
