= Ya Foy! =

Studio album by Sarazino
- Released: August 25, 2009 US
- Genres: World music; reggae; Latin; hip hop; African funk
- Label: Cumbancha

Sarazino chronology
Mundo Babilón (2003)	Ya Foy! (2009)

Ya Foy! is Sarazino's 2009 release on the independent label Cumbancha. The world music album features Toots Hibbert, of Toots and the Maytals, as well as African singer Revelino. The album features influence from various genres such as reggae, Latin music, hip-hop, and African funk.

== Track list ==
No.	Title	Length
1.	"Iheyo!"	3:07
2.	"Ecos de Radio Iguana (Echoes of Radio Iguana)"	3:59
3.	"People"	3:44
4.	"Noticias del Enemigo (News from the Enemy)"	4:18
5.	"Desbaratado (Messed Up)"	3:39
6.	"Cochabamba"	3:42
7.	"Nadia"	3:47
8.	"Quien Era Leila? (Who Was Leila?)"	3:22
9.	"Mundo Babilon 2 (Babylon World)"	3:23
10.	"Machala Woman"	3:28
11.	"No Soy Mandela (I'm Not Mandela)"	3:49
12.	"One Big World"	4:32
13.	"Fuera de Babilonia (Out of Babylon)"	3:17
14.	"On Va Tout Changer (We're Going to Change Everything)"	3:42
