= Karam (album) =

Studio album by Kimi Djabate
- Released: July 28, 2009
- Genre: World, Afro-Latin
- Label: Cumbancha

Kimi Djabate chronology
Teriké (2009)	Karam (2009)	Kanamalu (2016)

Karam is Kimi Djabate's second solo album for U.S.-based label, Cumbancha, released on July 28, 2009 in the U.S. and on August 24, 2009 in the UK.

== Critical reception ==
Professional ratings
Review scores
Source	Rating
AllMusic	4/5 stars
Billboard	4/5 stars

Chris Nickson of AllMusic called the album's songs "delicious creations, lulling, melodic, and even catchy to Western ears, especially 'Karam', with its memorable chorus, and 'Banhané'", and that "although not startling or revolutionary, Karam is a lovely addition to the canon of African music, and the wider introduction of an excellent talent." Philip Van Vleck of Billboard called Karam "a quiet tour de force" and praised Djabate's musicianship, songwriting and vocals. Deanna Sole of PopMatters stated that Djabate "sings like a neighborhood storyteller who just happens to have a good voice, inserting himself into the music with a piece of spoken word, an exclamation, and a laugh – little things, human, eccentric things – that light up the moderate background of balafon (an African xylophone) and guitar".

== Track listing ==
No.	Title	Length
1.	"Kodé (Love)"	5:34
2.	"Karam (Education)"	5:12
3.	"Djombé (Personality)"	3:40
4.	"Mussolu (Women)"	6:38
5.	"Mogolu (The People)"	6:19
6.	"Manla (I Cannot Believe It)"	4:34
7.	"Ná (Mother)"	4:31
8.	"Dabó (Tribute to Dabó)"	5:16
9.	"Fatu (Tribute to Fatumata)"	5:24
10.	"Manhó (Bride)"	5:14
11.	"Alifatá (Stop!)"	3:27
12.	"Djalia (The Griot's Art)"	4:30
13.	"Fulolón (Ethnicity)"	4:37
14.	"Banhané (Enough)"	6:10
15.	"Bagi (Tribute to Bagi)"	3:54
