= Coba Coba =

Studio album by Novalima
- Released: January 13, 2009 US
- Recorded: 2005–2008
- Genres: World, reggae, dub, hip-hop, Afrobeat
- Label: Cumbancha
- Producer: Toni Economides

Novalima chronology
Afro (2005)	Coba Coba (2009)	Coba Coba Remixed (2009)

Coba Coba is the third album from the Peruvian band, Novalima. The 2009 release, off U.S.-based independent label Cumbancha further explores Afro-Peruvian music's African roots. The band employs various genres, reggae, dub, salsa, afro-beat, to create their sound. Coba Coba stays true to its traditional roots while simultaneously pushing the boundaries; "Most people still think Peru is only panpipes," says guitarist/keyboardist Rafael Morales. "This is our interpretation of traditional Afro-Peruvian music, forward-thinking but without losing the soul and tribal rhythms of its roots." The sound is cutting edge but traces its roots back to the times of Spanish Colonial rule and slavery.

== Critical reception ==
Coba Coba was nominated for a 2009 Latin Grammy Award for Best Alternative Album. Neil Spencer of The Guardian called the album "a polished fusion borrowing freely from folk, salsa, highbrow poetry, and ghetto dancefloor." Allmusic's Jeff Tamarkin said that "its more minimalist, harder-edged production and less global-minded reach allow for fewer sonic surprises" than the band's previous album, Afro. Ernest Barteldes of the Houston Press remarked that the fusion of Peruvian music with "elements of electronica, hip-hop, samba, and other genres" results in a sound that is "something fresh that still is closely attached to their roots." Nils Jacobson of PopMatters gave the album a 9 out of 10 rating and wrote: "Elements of funk, reggae, salsa, Afrobeat, hip-hop, and dub mingle freely with traditional landó, marinera, cumanana, and vals criollo—there are no forced combinations—and the guest musicians, mainly horn players and vocalists, add extra flavor."

== Track listing ==
No.	Title	Length
1.	"Concheperla"	4:11
2.	"Libertá"	3:40
3.	"Se Me Van"	4:37
4.	"Ruperta/Puede Ser"	4:04
5.	"Africa Lando"	4:18
6.	"Coba Guarango"	4:07
7.	"Camote"	4:26
8.	"Mujer Ajena"	3:51
9.	"Tumbala"	4:00
10.	"Kumaná"	5:23
11.	"Yo Voy"	3:51
12.	"Bolero"	3:37
