= Shirat Hasticker =

"Shirat HaSticker"

Single by Hadag Nahash

from the album Homer Mekomi
- Released: 2004
- Genre: Rap
- Length: 4:18
- Songwriter: David Grossman

Shirat Hasticker (Hebrew: שירת הסטיקר, "The Sticker Song"), is a song recorded by Israeli hip-hop group Hadag Nahash, appearing on their 2004 album Homer Mekomi, written by Israeli novelist David Grossman.

This unusual collaboration of a mainstream author with a popular hip-hop group makes the song rather unusual. Samuel G. Freedman wrote in The New York Times, "imagine the dazzling unlikeliness of Russell Banks having collaborated with Mos Def or Chuck D on a chart topper."

== Puns and cultural references ==
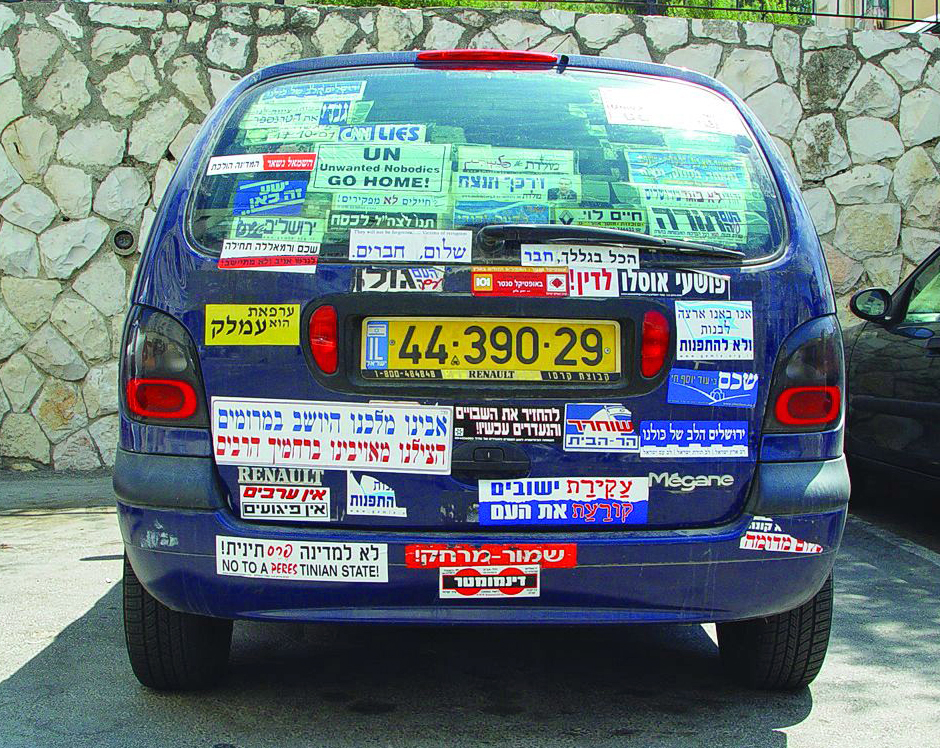
some of the stickers mentioned in the song

The lines in the song are all direct quotes or plays on slogans appearing on bumper stickers in Israel. The unique collage of opposing political slogans juxtaposed against apolitical slogans and satires creates a bitter irony. As such, the song demonstrates a cross section of Israeli society. The music video features the members of the band dressed as the different sectors of society (e.g. Haredim (ultra-orthodox), Arabs, secular Jews, settlers), each singing a line from the song, often contradicting the character singing it. For instance, the Haredi man sings, "Mandatory conscription for everyone" and the suicide bomber sings "No Arabs, no terrorist attacks."

The song contains puns and references to Israeli society. The chorus contains the line: קוראים לי נחמן ואני מגמ-מגמגם "I am called Nachman, I stutt-stutter," referencing the Breslov mantra widely popularized by Rabbi Yisroel Ber Odesser: Na Nach Nachma Nachman Meuman, a phrase written as graffiti across Israel. Another pun used is the phrase "Religious state? The state is gone", which actually means "Religious state? The state is ruined". This is the direct translation from the Hebrew: מדינת הלכה - הלכה המדינה: Medinat Halacha, Halcha ha-Medina, where Halacha is Jewish religious law, and halcha is the past feminine singular conjugation of the verb 'to go.'
