= Lazuz =

LaZuz

Studio album by Hadag Nahash
- Released: 10 January 2003
- Recorded: April–May 2002
- Studio: Anana and Zaza Studios
- Genre: Hip hop, funk, pop
- Length: 45:56
- Label: Hed-Arzi
- Producer: Yossi Fine

Hadag Nahash chronology
Ha Mechona Shel Ha Groove (2000)	LaZuz (2003)	Chomer MiKomi (2004)

LaZuz (לזוז) is the second studio album by Israeli hip-hop band, Hadag Nahash, released in 2003, which features one of their most popular songs 'To Move'.

== Track listing ==
1. "I Got Up" – 3:35 - Kamti - קמתי
2. "To Move" – 4:04 - Lazuz - לזוז
3. "Secret Of Success" – 3:08 - Sod Ha'Hatzlaha - סוד ההצלחה
4. "Numbers" – 4:26 - Misparim - מספרים
5. "Not Suckers" – 4:12 - Lo Frayerim - לא פראיירים
6. "Suckers" – 4:03 - Frayerim - פראיירים
7. "Gabi & Debi" – 5:12 - Gabi VeDebi - גבי ודבי
8. "The Garden of Eden" – 0:46 - Gan Eden - גן עדן
9. "The Strawberry Garden" – 4:28 - Gan HaTut - גן התות
10. "Bella Bellissima" – 3:42 - בלה בליסימה
11. "BelisDub" – 0:35 - בליס דאב
12. "The Strawberry Machine" – 3:32 - Mekhonat HaTut - מכונת התות
13. "It Wasn't Me" – 4:21 - Ze Lo Ani - זה לא אני
