= Cumbancha =

American record label

Coordinates: 44.340385°N 73.185799°W

- Founded: 2006
- Founder: Jacob Edgar
- Country of origin: United States
- Location: Charlotte, Vermont
- Official website: cumbancha.com

Cumbancha is a record label, booking agency and music publisher based in Charlotte, Vermont, United States. The company was founded by ethnomusicologist and music producer Jacob Edgar in 2006. In 2007, Cumbancha Music Publishing was established to expand opportunities for artists, helping them license songs to various movies, television programs, and advertisements, including Boyhood, Grey's Anatomy, and High Maintenance. Cumbancha Booking was founded in 2010 to book tours for artists on and off the label, bringing them to venues such as Hollywood Bowl, Montreal Jazz Festival, New Orleans Jazz & Heritage Festival, Lincoln Center, Central Park SummerStage, and Austin City Limits. Artists on the label include The Idan Raichel Project, Habib Koité and Bamada, Rupa & the April Fishes, Sierra Leone's Refugee All Stars, The Touré-Raichel Collective, and Lakou Mizik, among many others. The name "Cumbancha" derives from the Cuban word of West African derivation meaning an impromptu musical gathering or party.

== Awards ==
Cumbancha was awarded the Top Label Award by WOMEX in 2008.

== Location ==
Cumbancha headquarters is located in Charlotte, Vermont, in a refurbished, solar-powered barn, which also contains the Putumayo World Music Archive.

== Releases ==
Artist	Album	Release Date	Catalog Number
Ska Cubano	¡Ay Caramba! (discontinued)	July 11, 2006	CMB-CD-1
Idan Raichel Project	The Idan Raichel Project	November 7, 2006	CMB-CD-2
Andy Palacio & The Garifuna Collective	Wátina (discontinued)	February 27, 2007	CMB-CD-3
Dobet Gnahore	Na Afriki	June 26, 2007	CMB-CD-4
Habib Koité	Afriki	September 25, 2007	CMB-CD-5
Umalali	The Garifuna Women's Project (discontinued)	March 18, 2008	CMB-CD-6
Rupa & the April Fishes	eXtraOrdinary rendition	April 15, 2008	CMB-CD-7
Chiwoniso Maraire	Rebel Woman	August 26, 2008	CMB-CD-8
Novalima	Coba Coba	October 14, 2008	CMB-CD-9
The Idan Raichel Project	Within My Walls	February 24, 2009	CMB-CD-10
Novalima	Coba Coba Remixed	June 16, 2009	CMB-CD-11
Kimi Djabate	Karem	July 28, 2009	CMB-CD-12
Sarazino	Ya Foy!	August 25, 2009	CMB-CD-13
Kailash Kher and Kailasa	Yatra (discontinued)	September 29, 2009	CMB-CD-14
Rupa & the April Fishes	Este mundo	October 27, 2009	CMB-CD-15
Razia Said	Zebu Nation	February 23, 2010	CMB-CD-16
Luísa Maita	Lero-Lero	July 27, 2010	CMB-CD-17
Sierra Leone's Refugee All Stars	Rise & Shine	March 23, 2010	CMB-CD-18
Sergent Garcia	Una y Otra Vez	March 22, 2011	CMB-CD-19
Bombino	Agadez	April 19, 2011	CMB-CD-20
The Touré-Raichel Collective	The Tel Aviv Session	March 27, 2012	CMB-CD-22
Sierra Leone's Refugee All Stars	Radio Salone	April 24, 2012	CMB-CD-23
Sarazino	Everyday Salama	May 22, 2012	CMB-CD-24
Kobo Town	Jumbie in the Jukebox (discontinued)	April 23, 2013	CMB-CD-25
Idan Raichel	Quarter to Six	June 2, 2013	CMB-CD-26
The Garifuna Collective	Ayó (discontinued)	July 2, 2013	CMB-CD-27
Danny Michel with The Garifuna Collective	Black Birds Are Dancing Over Me (discontinued)	July 2, 2013	CMB-CD-28
Joe Driscoll & Sekou Kouyate	Faya	February 18, 2014	CMB-CD-29
Sierra Leone's Refugee All Stars	Libation	March 18, 2014	CMB-CD-30
Ricardo Lemvo & Makina Loca	La Rumba SoYo	June 24, 2014	CMB-CD-31
The Touré-Raichel Collective	The Paris Session	September 30, 2014	CMB-CD-32
Razia Said	Akory (discontinued)	November 10, 2014	CMB-CD-33
Rocky Dawuni	Branches of the Same Tree	March 31, 2015	CMB-CD-34
Daby Touré	Amonafi	September 18, 2015	CMB-CD-35
Francesca Blanchard	deux visions	October 2, 2015	VAV-CD-60
Idan Raichel	At the Edge of the Beginning	January 22, 2016	CMB-CD-36
Joe Driscoll & Sekou Kouyate	Monistic Theory	May 13, 2016	CMB-CD-37
Lakou Mizik	Wa Di Yo	April 1, 2016	CMB-CD-38
Luísa Maita	Fio da Memória	September 23, 2016	CMB-CD-39
Idan Raichel	Idan Raichel – Piano – Songs	September 22, 2017	CMB-CD-40
Luísa Maita	Maita Remixed	November 9, 2010	CMB-CD-87
Various	Hear Globally: A Cumbancha Collection	April 7, 2009	CMB-CD-91
Sarazino	Mama Funny Day	September 28, 2018	CMB-CD-117
Idan Raichel	And If You Will Come To Me	January 31, 2019	CMB-CD-119
Lakou Mizik	HaitiaNola	October 25, 2019	CMB-CD-122
Dobet Gnahoré	Couleur	June 4, 2021	CMB-CD-145
Sangit	Studio Sessions	November 19, 2021	CMB-DIG-151
Kolonien	Till Skogen	April 22, 2022	CMB-CD-155
Mista Savona Presents: Havana Meets Kingston	Havana Meets Kingston Part 2	June 3, 2022	CMB-CD-156
Wesli	Tradisyon	October 21, 2022	CMB-CD-163

== See also ==
- List of record labels
- Putumayo World Music
