= Luísa Maita =

Brazilian singer-songwriter (born 1982)

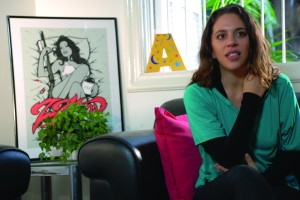

Background information
- Born: Luísa Taubkin Maita; April 27, 1982 (age 44); São Paulo, Brazil
- Genres: MPB, Latin jazz, world
- Occupations: Singer, songwriter
- Instrument: Vocals
- Label: Cumbancha
- Website: www.luisamaita.com

Luísa Maita (Portuguese pronunciation: [luˈizɐ]) is a Brazilian singer-songwriter known for her mix of traditional Brazilian samba, bossa nova, and MPB along with modern electronic sounds. Her debut album was released in the US and Europe on the label Cumbancha and in Brazil by Oi Música in May 2010.

== Biography ==
Maita was born in São Paulo, Brazil on April 27, 1982, into a musical family. Her father, Amado Maita, was a composer and musician and her mother, Myriam Taubkin, is a singer and music producer. Her name derives from a song by the bossa nova pioneer Antonio Carlos Jobim, whom her parents also named her two sisters after. The samba was present in Luisa's early days because of the experiences of her father in Bixiga, a working-class neighborhood in São Paulo famous for its culture, food, and music.

As a child at home, Maita started singing samba, bossa nova, and her father's compositions, and at the age of seven began recording jingles. In 2001, Maita founded her first band, Urbanda, with Morris Picciotto, but eventually left to pursue a solo career. Maita sang in a 2009 promotional video directed by Fernando Meirelles for the 2016 Olympics bid, wrote two songs for Virginia Rosa's album Samba a Dois (2006), and wrote "Beleza" with Rodrigo Campos for Mariana Aydar's second album, which was one of the best songs of 2009 according to Rolling Stone Brazil magazine.

In 2010, Maita released her first solo album, Lero-Lero on Cumbancha. She says the title means "an informal conversation". Maita wrote a number of the songs, with others arranged by string expert Paulo Lepetit and bassist Rodrigo Campos, who both perform on the album. Cumbancha also released a remixed version of Lero-Lero in the same year, entitled Maita Remixed.

In November 2010, Maita made her first North America tour. During the tour, she appeared on NPR's Tiny Desk Concert and KCRW's Morning Becomes Eclectic show. In Brazil, the album appeared in lists of the best albums of 2010, including in the magazines Veja and Rolling Stone Brasil.

In July 2011, Maita received the award for Best New Artist in the twenty-second edition of the Brazilian Music Award, and went on her first European tour, playing in festivals such as Nuits du Sud in France and Musicas do Mundo in Portugal. The 2014 coming-of-age film Boyhood, directed by Richard Linklater, featured two of Maita's songs, including "Lero-Lero".

Maita's second solo album, Fio da Memória, or "threads of memory", was released by Cumbancha in 2016.

== Genre and influences ==
Lero-Lero combines influences from alternative pop, downtempo electronica, MPB (música popular brasileira), samba, and bossa nova all on an acoustic base. The overall sound of her album Fio da Memória was inspired by the bustle of the city in São Paulo. Maita cites Billie Holiday, Chet Baker, Michael Jackson, Sade, Kid Cudi, and Nana Vasconcelos as inspirations for her music. As a child, her parents introduced her to João Gilberto, Nana Caymmi, Vinicius de Moraes, Milton Nascimento, Edu Lobo, and Baden Powell. Some of the rhythms in her album are drawn from the Afro-Brazilian martial art capoeira.

== Discography ==
- Lero-Lero (Oi Música, Cumbancha, 2010)
- Maita Remixed (Cumbancha, 2010)
- Fio da Memória (Cumbancha, 2016)

== Awards ==
- 2011 – Best New Artist at the Brazilian Music Awards (the Brazilian equivalent of the Grammy)
