= Sarazino =

- Born: Lamine Fellah; 3 March 1970 (age 55); Constantine, Algeria
- Genres: World music, reggae, Latin, hip-hop, African funk
- Labels: Cumbancha

Sarazino (born Lamine Fellah, 3 March 1970 in Constantine, Algeria) is an Algerian musician, songwriter and record producer, who first created the Sarazino project in 1995 while living in Montreal, Quebec, Canada.

== Background ==
Lamine Fellah was raised the son of a career diplomat in Constantine, Algeria. His father's profession moved Lamine and his family all around the world; they lived in Spain, Switzerland, Burundi and Burkina Faso. At the age of 14, residing in Burkina Faso, Lamine acquired his first drum kit and became interested in writing his own music. His father was assassinated by Islamic radicals in Algeria, and his family was forced into exile.

In 1996, Lamine visited Ecuador; he has since moved to Quito. In 1998, Lamine moved to Montreal, Quebec, Canada to study economics and political science at the University of Montréal.

== Discography ==
- Mundo Babilón (2003)
- Ya Foy! (2009)
- Everyday Salama (2012)
- Mama Funny Day (2018)
