= Live! (Habib Koité & Bamada album) =

Foly ! Live around the world

Live album by Habib Koité & Bamada
- Released: 2004
- Label: Contre-Jour

Habib Koité & Bamada chronology
Baro (2001)	Foly ! Live around the world (2004)	Afriki (2007)

Live! is a live album by Habib Koité & Bamada.

== Track listing ==
1. "Muso Ko" (Amsterdam, July 13, 2002)
2. "Fatma" (Tübingen, June 28, 2002)
3. "Ma Ya" (Oldenburg, June 29, 2002)
4. "Sirata" (Cremona, April 25, 2002)
5. "Batoumambe" (Zurich, November 3, 2001)
6. "Bitile" (Oldenburg, June 29, 2002)
7. "Imada" (Muhletal, June 21, 2002)
8. "Kanawa" (Wurselen, July 30, 2002)
9. "Wari" (Tübingen, June 28, 2002)
10. "Nanale" (Tübingen, June 28, 2002)
11. "Komine" (Frick, June 22, 2002)
12. "Nimato" (Luzern, July 6, 2002)
13. "Saramaya" (Tübingen, June 28, 2002)
14. "Sin Djen Djen" (Amsterdam, July 13, 2002)
15. "Wassiye" (Tübingen, July 28, 2002)
16. "Cigarette Abana" (Zurich, November 3, 2001)
17. "Kunfe Ta" (Oldenburg, June 29, 2002)
18. "Takamba" (Biel, July 18, 2002)
