= Coba Coba Remixed =

Remix album by Novalima
- Released: June 16, 2009 US
- Genres: World, reggae, dub, hip hop, Afrobeat
- Label: Cumbancha

Novalima chronology
Coba Coba (2009)	Coba Coba Remixed (2009)

Coba Coba Remixed is the first remix album of Novalima's original album, Coba Coba, both under the U.S. independent record label, Cumbancha. It was released on June 16, 2009, and features electronic-influenced remixes of songs from Coba Coba.

== Reception ==
The album was generally well received, with Johnathan Rothman (of Exclaim!) praising its "musical blend of Afro-Peruvian call-and-response traditions with dub, house, salsa, breaks and whatever else they like." Based on customer reviews, the album holds a rating of 4 out of 5 stars on Amazon

== Track listing ==
No.	Title	Length
1.	"Tumbala (Da Lata Remix)"	5:21
2.	"Ruperta (Zeb Remix)"	5:01
3.	"Coba Guarango (Toni Economides Remix)"	6:34
4.	"Yo Voy (Faze Action Remix)"	4:55
5.	"Bomba"	3:42
6.	"Tumbala (Oreja Remix)"	6:10
7.	"Yo Voy (Seiji Remix)"	4:57
8.	"Africa Landó (Boozoo Bajou Remix)"	5:13
9.	"Camote Dub"	2:59
10.	"Ruperta (DJ Spam Remix)"	2:54
11.	"Se Me Van (EarthRise "Bedouin Breakdown" Remix)"	5:35
12.	"Tumbala (StreamerPilot's ¡Azu Madre! Remix)"	5:05
13.	"Bomba (Coba Soundsystem Mix)"	5:43
14.	"Yo Voy (Daniel Haaksman Remix)"	5:06
