= Razia (singer) =

- Born: Razia Said; December 1, 1959 (age 66)
- Origin: Antalaha, Madagascar
- Genres: World music
- Occupation: Singer-songwriter
- Instruments: Vocal, guitar
- Label: Cumbancha
- Website: www.raziasaid.com

== Biography ==
Razia Said is a singer, songwriter and an environmental activist from Antalaha, Madagascar.

Razia Said was born on born December 1, 1959 at the Eastern Coast of Madagascar of an Afro-Arabic Mother and an Indian Father. She was raised with the sound of valiha, a local stringed bamboo instrument and singing to her Uncle’s guitar playing.

At the age of ten she moved to Gabon in West Africa where she began to sing in a local church choir and continued listening to traditional Malagasy music, the Beatles, Bob Marley and James Brown.

== Career ==
Over the years Razia has experimented with French chanson, rock, jazz, and even smooth Sade-style R&B. She found her true voice interpreting traditional Malagasy music in her native tongue. Razia's music draws elements from Malagasy music and Afrobeats. She began incorporating features of jazz and R&B to her music after visiting New York in 1987.

In February 2007, Razia returned to Madagascar with her full band to record music around the big island. Environmental damage from unfettered slash-and-burn agriculture, illegal logging, and climate change was so profound that she hardly recognized the land she had left as an 11 year old.

In 2006, Razia recorded her album Magical after relocating to New York. During her subsequent visits to Madagascar, she met Njava, one of the country's prominent musical groups. Inspired by her experiences in Madagascar, Razia began writing and recording songs in the Malagasy language, incorporating traditional sounds and melodies from her childhood.

Razia's music often focuses on environmental issues, particularly the protection and preservation of Madagascar's natural environment. She addresses the impacts of climate change and deforestation through her songs. According to an article in Broadway World her album The Road features "a warm, welcoming set of songs that take us deep into the emotional reality of Razia's self-made, globe-spanning life."

== Discography ==
- Magical (2006)
- Zebu Nation (2010)
- Akory (2015)
- The Road (2018)
