= The Idan Raichel Project (album) =

2002 studio album by the Idan Raichel Project

Studio album by Idan Raichel
- Released: 2002
- Genre: World music
- Label: Helicon Records

Idan Raichel chronology
The Idan Raichel Project (2002)	Mi'ma'amakim (2005)

The Idan Raichel Project is the debut album by Idan Raichel's musical project of the same name. Raichel composed and arranged many of the tracks, performed vocals and keyboards, while collaborating with other vocalists and musicians. Singles from the album include "Bo'ee" (בואי / Come with Me), "Im Telech" (אם תלך / If You Go), and "Medabrim Besheket" (מדברים בשקט / Speaking Quietly).

While the majority of the songs are sung in Hebrew, a few are entirely in Amharic, while others include small passages in Amharic, by male and female voices, setting traditional-sounding tunes to modern music.

The album was certified 3× platinum, selling over 120,000 copies in Israel. In a review, Exclaim! noted that "For all of its divergent influences, the album hangs together remarkably well."

== Track listing ==
1. "Blessing for the New Year" (3:31) ברכות לשנה החדשה
2. "Bo'ee" (4:25) בואי
3. "Im Telech" (2:48) אם תלך
4. "Ayal-Ayale" (3:35)
5. "Hinach Yafa" (4:53) הנך יפה
6. "Brong Faya" (4:05)
7. "Medabrim Besheket" (3:54) מדברים בשקט
8. "Shoshanim Atzuvot" (2:35) שושנים עצובות
9. "Tigest" (4:37) טיגסט
10. "Mimi's Song" (2:32) השיר של מימי
11. "Et Lihyot, Et Lamut" (3:52) עת לחיות, עת למות
12. "Boee (Radio)" (4:07) בואי (רדיו)
