= Zebu Nation =

Studio album by Razia
- Released: February 23, 2010
- Genre: Malagasy, Jazz, R&B
- Label: Cumbancha

Zebu Nation is Razia Said's first album on the U.S. based label Cumbancha. On the album, Razia sings about the damage deforestation has had on the natural environment of her native island, Madagascar. Razia Said engages the Malagasy style she grew up with while blending the jazz and R&B sounds she became familiar with while living in New York City. Razia recorded the album as her way of fighting for the environment and her home land. The title references the reason for Madagascar's destruction: the zebu, a breed of cattle. Madagascar's forests are destroyed by method of slash-and-burn to create pastures for grazing animals like zebu.

== Track listing ==
No.	Title	Length
1.	"Babonao"	2:46
2.	"Omama"	4:40
3.	"Yoyoyo"	3:14
4.	"Salamalama Aby"	3:22
5.	"NY Atlantiska"	5:03
6.	"Slash and Burn"	4:30
7.	"Tsy Tara"	3:41
8.	"Lalike"	2:51
9.	"Tiako Ro"	4:04
10.	"Mifohaza"	5:47
