= Khomer Mekomi =

Studio album by Hadag Nahash
- Released: 2004
- Recorded: January 2004
- Studios: Anana and Zaza Studios
- Genre: Hip hop/Funk
- Length: 55:33
- Label: Anana/Hed Arzi (עננה/הד ארצי)
- Producer: Yossi Fine

Hadag Nahash chronology
| LaZuz (2003) | Khomer Mekomi (2004) | Be'ezrat Ha'Jam (2006) |

Khomer Mekomi (חומר מקומי) (lit. "local material") is the third studio album by Israeli Hip-Hop band Hadag Nahash, released in 2004.

The album features "Shirat HaSticker" (The Sticker Song), whose lyrics are based on a variety of political bumper stickers in Israel. The lyrics were written by Israel novelist David Grossman.

It also features the first use of English on a Hadag Nahash record: Most of the opening song, "Mithamem" is in English.

== Track listing ==
1. Mithamem (Hebrew: מתחמם) ("It's Heating Up")
2. Bereshit (Hebrew: בראשית) ("In the Beginning")
3. Shirat HaSticker (Hebrew: שירת הסטיקר) ("The Sticker Song")
4. Halifot (Hebrew: חליפות) ("Uniforms")
5. Johnny HaKatan (Hebrew: ג'וני הקטן) ("Little Johnny")
6. HaKafa HaMtzaltzelet (Hebrew: הכפה המצלצלת) ("The Ringing Slap")
7. HaPeh Lifto'ah (Hebrew: הפה לפתוח) ("The Mouth To Open")
8. Shvita (Hebrew: שביתה) ("Strike")
9. Muzika (Hebrew: מוסיקה) ("Music")
10. Yatziv (Hebrew: יציב) ("Stable")
11. Rak Po (Hebrew: רק פה) ("Only Here")
12. Melodica (Hebrew: מלודיקה) ("Melodica")
13. Ma Na'aseh? (Hebrew: מה נעשה?) ("What Will We Do?")
14. Ratziti SheTida (Elohim Sheli) (Hebrew: רציתי שתדע) ("I Wanted You to Know (My God)")

== See also ==
- Israeli music
