= Afriki =

Studio album by Habib Koité & Bamada
- Released: September 25, 2007
- Genre: World
- Length: 46:34
- Label: Cumbancha
- Producer: Habib Koite

Habib Koité & Bamada chronology
Live! (Habib Koité & Bamada album) (2004)	Afriki (2007)

Professional ratings
Review scores
Source	Rating
Allmusic	4/5 stars

Afriki is the fourth studio album by Habib Koité & Bamada, published by Cumbancha & Contre-Jour

== Track listing ==
- All Songs Written By Habib Koite
1. "Namania" 4:11
2. "N'tesse" 4:33
3. "Africa" 4:51
4. "Fimani" 4:28
5. "N'ba" 4:40
6. "Mali Ba" 4:44
7. "Barra" 3:48
8. "N'Teri" 4:36
9. "Nta Dima" 3:05
10. "Massake" 3:53
11. "Titati" 3:23
