= Ma Ya =

Studio album by Habib Koité & Bamada
- Released: 1998
- Studio: Studio Caraïbes, Studio Molière, Studio Wanda (Bamako)
- Genre: World Music, African Music, Malian Music
- Label: Contre-Jour
- Producer: Habib Koité

Habib Koité & Bamada chronology
Muso Ko (1995)	Ma Ya (1998)	Baro (2001)

Professional ratings
Review scores
Source	Rating
Q	4/5 stars

Ma Ya is the second studio album by Habib Koité & Bamada.

== Track listing ==
- All songs written and arranged by Habib Koité. Lyrics translated by Assetou Gologo.
- Track list:
1. "I Mada"
2. "Wassiye"
3. "Ma Ya"
4. "Bitile"
5. "Sirata"
6. "Foro Bana"
7. "Sarayama"
8. "Kumbin"
9. "Mara Kaso"
10. "Pula Ku"
11. "Komine"
12. "Manssa Cise"

== Personnel ==
- Habib Koité: Vocals, Guitars
- Boubacar Sidibe: Guitars, Harmonica, Vocals
- Abdoul Wahab Berthe: Bass, Ngoni
- Baba Sissoko: Ngoni, Balafon
- Souleymane Ann: Drums, Vocals
