= Kimi Djabaté =

Bissau-Guinean musician

- Born: Kimi Djabaté; January 20, 1975 (age 51); Tabato, Guinea-Bissau
- Genres: World music
- Occupation: Musician
- Instruments: Vocal, guitar, Balafón, Kora
- Label: Cumbancha

Kimi Djabaté (born January 20, 1975) is a Bissau-Guinean Afro-beat/blues musician, based in Lisbon, Portugal.

== Early life ==
Djabaté was born into a poor but musically accomplished family in Tabato, Guinea-Bissau; it was an area recognised as a centre for music, dance, and other creative arts. His interest in music started at the age of three when he started playing the balafon, the African xylophone, quickly learning other traditional instruments. In his pre-teens he left home to the neighboring village of Sonako to study the kora. This helped him in the future by subsequently developing his guitar playing ability. His talent as a musician became much more than a childhood hobby for Djabaté as he was required to play at local ceremonies to help contribute to the family income. This became a source of conflict for Djabaté and his family. His parents and uncle forced him to perform against his will which took away from much of the free time other youth his age were enjoying.

Djabaté's parents as well as his uncle, through pressuring him to perform, provided him with training in traditional Mandingo music. However Djabaté was also interested in popular African genres such as the local dance music style gumbé, Nigerian afrobeat, Cape Verdean morna, and western jazz and blues, all of which have influenced his music.

== Musical career ==
After touring Europe with the national music and dance ensemble of Guinea-Bissau, Djabaté settled in Lisbon, Portugal. He has lived in Europe since, yet remains devoted to the music he grew up with in Guinea-Bissau. In Europe Djabaté collaborated with various artists, including Mory Kanté and Waldemar Bastos. In 2005, Djabaté released his first solo album, Teriké, which he released independently. Djabaté second solo album, Karam, was released on July 28, 2009, under the label, Cumbancha. The album has themes of social and political realities, the suffering of African people, the fight against poverty, freedom, women's rights, and love.

== Discography ==
- Teriké (2005)
- Karam (2009)
- Kanamalu (2016)
- Dindin (2023)
