= Be'ezrat Ha'Jam =

Studio album by Hadag Nahash
- Released: 2006
- Recorded: In the Pocket studios, California
- Genre: Hip hop/Funk
- Length: 63 Minutes
- Label: Hed Arzi
- Producer: Yosi Fine

Hadag Nahash chronology
Homer Mekomi (2003)	Be'ezrat Ha'Jam (2006)

Be'ezrat Ha'Jam (בעזרת הג'אם) is the fourth studio album by Israeli hip-hop band, Hadag Nahash, released in 2006. The name of the album, a pun on the Jewish phrase "Be'ezrat Ha'Shem" (בעזרת השם), literally meaning "with the help of god", or translated into modern speech, "God willing", literally means "with the help of the jam". Three songs "California", "Ma She'Ba Ba", and "Hine Ani Ba" were used in the film You Don't Mess With The Zohan (2009).

== Information ==
"Hine Ani Ba" (הנה אני בא) ("Here I Come") describes the modern-age cultural conflict between Tel Aviv and Jerusalem, the two major metropolitan areas in Israel.

Having sold 20,000 copies, the album was awarded the status of a gold album.

== Track listing ==
1. Lotus (לוטוס) - "Lotus"
2. California (קליפורניה) "California"
3. Ma She'Ba Ba (מה שבא בא) - "What Comes Comes"
4. Hine Ani Ba (הנה אני בא) - "Here I Come"
5. Kol Ha'Chuchot (כל הצ'וצ'ות) - "All of the Chuchot"
6. Lehithalek Ba'Ir (להתחלק בעיר) - "To Share the City"
7. Statistika (סטטיסטיקה) - "Statistic"
8. Saga (סאגה) - "Saga"
9. Me'Habama Lehaftziz (מהבמה להפציץ) - "To Bomb from the Stage"
10. Teraga (תרגע) - "Relax"
11. Eize Keif (איזה כיף) - "What Fun"
12. Lehavi Et Ha'Maka (להביא את המכה) - "To Bring the Hit"
13. Shabhi Yerushalaim (שבחי ירושלים) - "Bless Jerusalem"
