= Habib Koité =

Malian musician (born 1958)

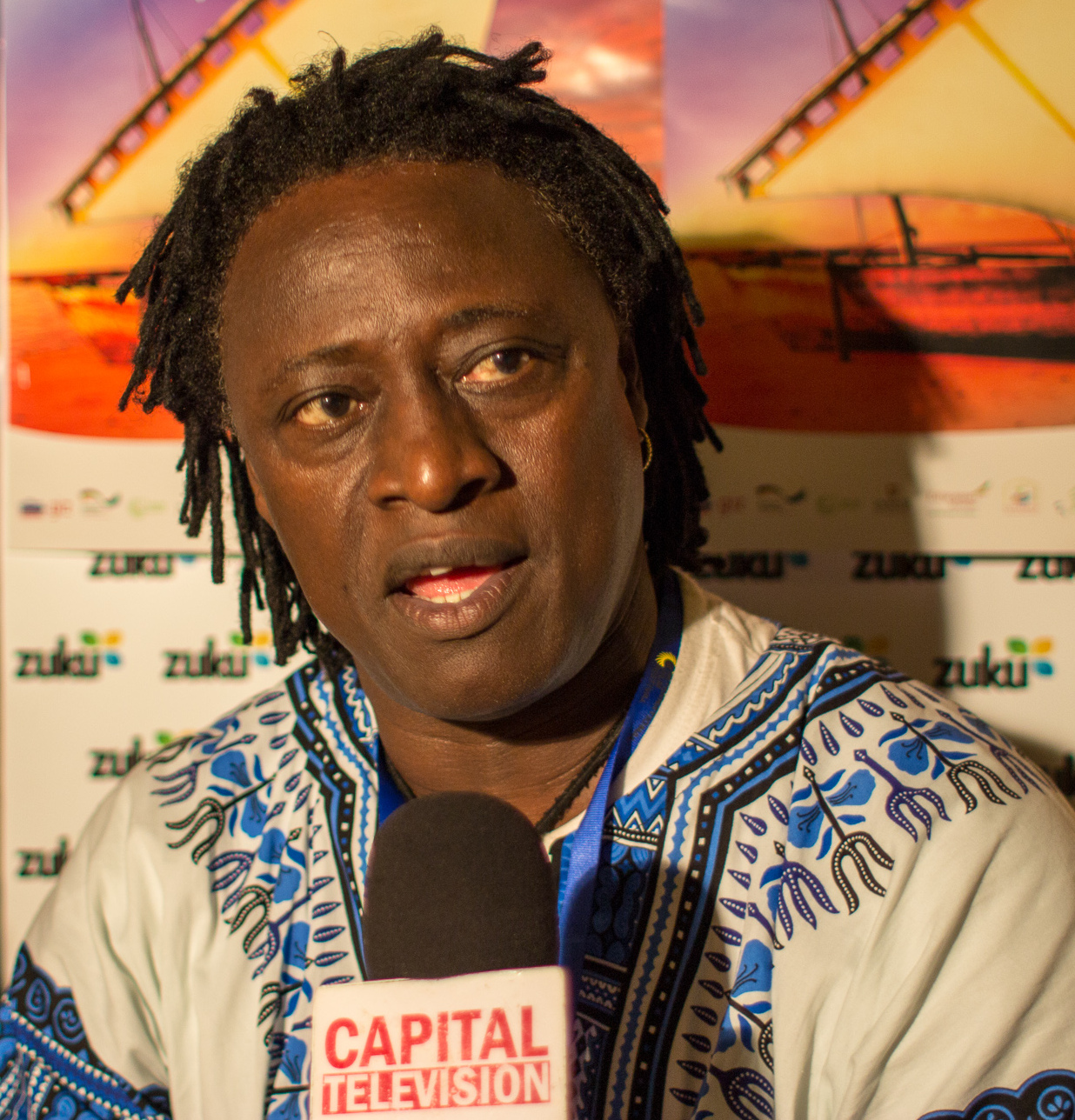
- Koité in 2014

Background information
- Born: 27 January 1958 (age 68)
- Genres: World music
- Occupations: Musician, singer, songwriter
- Instruments: Guitar, vocals
- Years active: 1988–present
- Label: Contre-Jour
- Website: http://habibkoite.com/

Habib Koité (Bambara: ߤߊߓߌߓ ߞߎߥߊߕߍ, romanized: Habib Kuwatɛ, born 1958 in Thiès, Senegal) is a Senegalian-born Malian musician, singer, songwriter and griot based in Mali. His band, Bamada, was a supergroup of West African musicians, which included Kélétigui Diabaté on balafon. Coming from a noble lineage of Khassonké griots, Koité is known for developing a distinctive guitar style that blends traditional Malian musical forms with elements of blues and Afro-Cuban music, while maintaining strong roots in Mali’s regional rhythms and cultural traditions.

== Musical style ==
Koité is known for his approach to playing the guitar by tuning it on a pentatonic scale and playing on open strings as one would on a kamale n'goni.

== History ==
Habib was born in Mali in 1958 and enrolled in the National Institute of Arts in Bamako. In 1988 he formed his first band, Bamada. He released his first solo album, Muso Ko, in 1995, followed by further solo works in later years.

Two of his songs, I Ka Barra and Din Din Wo, from Muso Ko, were included in the Sample Music package included with Windows Vista.

== Discography ==
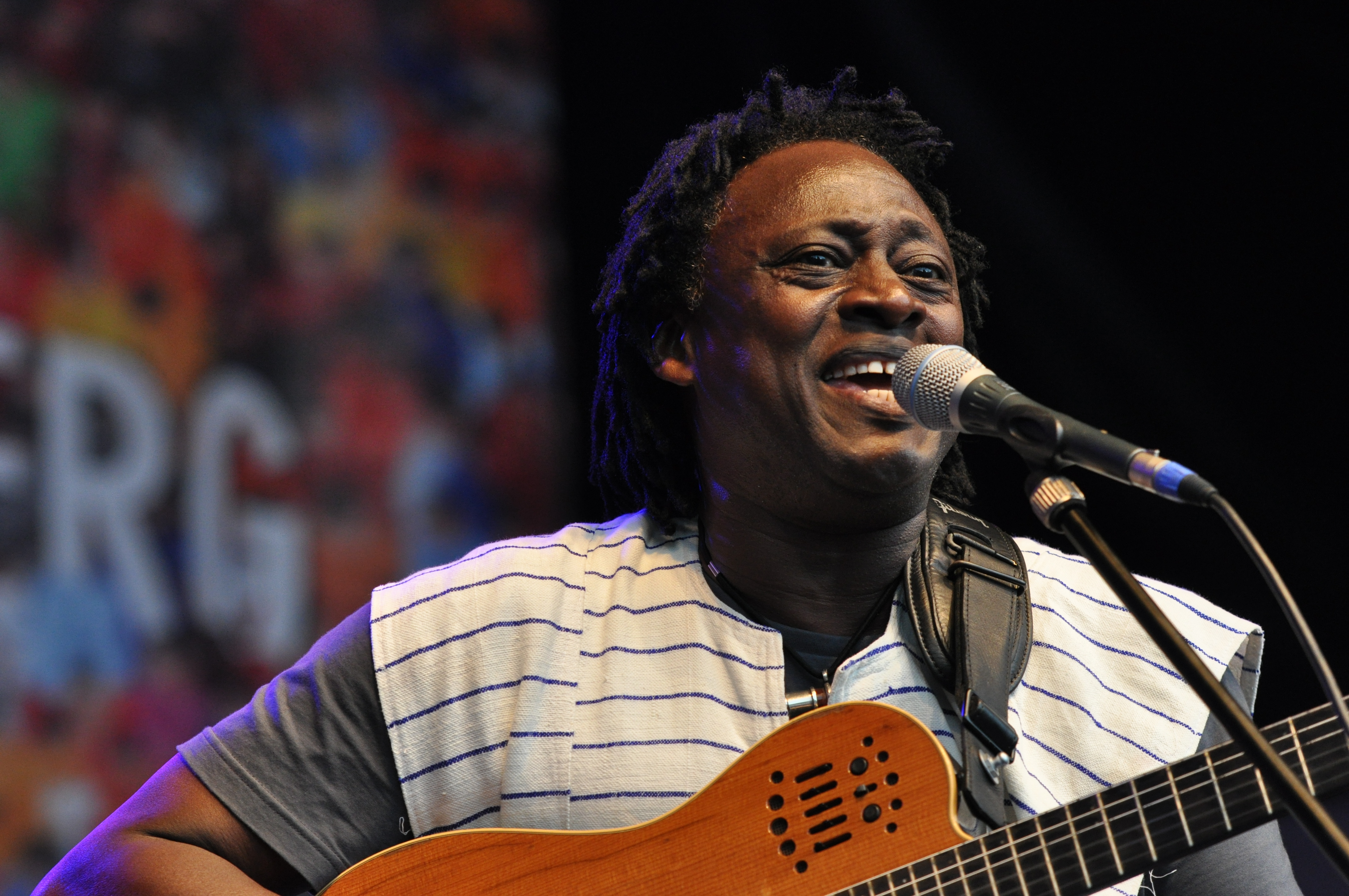
Habib Koité 2014 at the Bardentreffen music festival in Nuremberg

=== Albums ===
- Muso Ko, 1995
- Ma Ya, 1998
- Baro, 2001
- Live!, 2004
- Afriki, 2007
- Acoustic Africa in Concert, 2011
- Brothers in Bamako, 2012
- Soô, 2014
- Kharifa, 2019

== Sources ==
- Habib Koité Homepage
- Artist Profile
- Biography at Music-Wire
