= Yossi Fine =

Israeli bass guitarist and producer (born 1964)

Yossi Fine יוסי פיין
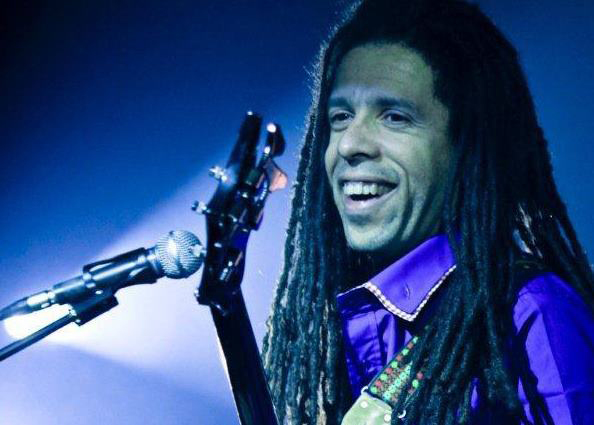
- Fine at Havana Club in Tel Aviv, 2011

Background information
- Born: Joseph Thomas Fine; December 7, 1964 (age 61); Paris, France
- Genres: World, reggae, funk, jazz
- Occupations: Musician, producer
- Instruments: Bass, guitar
- Years active: 1981–present
- Label: Avila Street Records
- Website: yossifine.com

Joseph Thomas Fine (Hebrew: יוסף תומס פיין; born December 7, 1964), known professionally as Yossi Fine (Hebrew: יוסי פיין), is an Israeli bassist and producer. Fine fronted the world music/reggae/funk band Ex-Centric Sound System.

== Biography ==
=== Personal life ===
Fine was born in Paris, France, to a West Indian vocalist mother and an Israeli guitarist father.

=== Early career ===
At the age of 16, Fine began working as a session musician in Israel. He moved to New York City in 1985, performing with a variety of musicians around the city, working regularly with the Gil Evans Orchestra from 1985 to 1991. In 1991, he received a Grammy nomination for his composition "Always Knows," which appears on the Stanley Jordan record Cornucopia. Fine moved back to Israel in 1995.

=== Ex-Centric Sound System and solo work ===
In 1997, Fine formed Ex-Centric Sound System with drummer Michael Avgil and three Ghanaian vocalists, Nana Dadzie, Adevo Savour and Benjamin Kouleho, who also contribute melodies on flute, kalimba and balafon. NME described Ex-Centric Sound System as "a band that mixes authentic African sounds with dub, techno and hip-hop," adding that the band is "a triumph of the collective imagination." Their debut album, Electric Voodooland, was released in 2001.

In 2007, he released the solo album Live in Jerusalem, consisting of four tracks culled from his one-man bass tour. "Few people are brave, or crazy, enough to stand on stage with a few simple drum loops, an effects board and a bass, and go for it. Yet that's exactly what he does, amazingly well," wrote PopMatters. "The landscapes he paints are orchestral, lush and textured." An introduction to Fine on Israeli music television station Music 24 proclaimed, "Yossi Fine does to bass what Hendrix did for electric guitar."

=== Collaborations ===
Fine has frequently worked with Malian guitarist Vieux Farka Touré. After remixing a track for 2008's Vieux Farka Touré Remixed: UFOs Over Bamako, he took a larger role in Touré's career, producing and playing bass on his 2009 album, Fondo, as well as remixing a track on the follow-up, Other Roads: Fondo Remixed, at Fine's studio in Novato, California. Fine plays bass in The Touré-Raichel Collective, a collaboration between Touré and Idan Raichel, which led to the 2012 album The Tel Aviv Sessions. Haaretz singled out his bass playing for being "flexible and dynamic."

Fine has performed, recorded with and produced music for musicians across the globe, including Naughty By Nature (recreating the bassline for their 1993 hit single "Hip Hop Hooray"), 85-91Gil Evans Orchestra, 85John Scofield, 86-87Kenny Kirkland, 87Lou Reed, Rubén Blades, 89-95Stanley Jordan, 93-94Me'shell Ndegeocello, David Bowie, Brian Eno, Anthony B, Karsh Kale, Cheb i Sabbah, Antibalas, Hassan Hakmoun, Hadag Nahash, Ofra Haza, Noa and Hamsa Lila.

Considered a pivotal force in the evolution of the bass, Fine has produced over 25 albums, and contributed bass to over 150. In 2005, he received the ACUM Award for music producing, for his work on Hadag Nahash's 2004 LP, Homer Mekomi. ACUM is Israel's music and literary rights association.

=== Yossi Fine & Ben Aylon ===
In 2016 Yossi moved from Bass to Microtonal guitar and together with drummer Ben Aylon formed a band Yossi Fine & Ben Aylon. The style of music is defined as 'Blue Desert' or Afro Arab Trance, inspired by regional music styles. In 2018 the band released their debut album 'Blue Desert' and toured Europe, USA, Canada, China, India and Israel.

== Artistic style ==
An early adopter of live looping in order to perform as a one-man band, Fine's style in his solo work has been called "extreme bass groove," incorporating drum & bass, breakbeat, dubstep and heavy metal influences. "When you cop such an attack on bass guitar, and make a line come at you with such power, that's extreme bass," he has said. "It's about creating a sound with tons of low end that pounds you in the chest and makes you go, Whoa!"

Fine has called U2 guitarist The Edge a huge influence, stating that his "echo-laden sound" is "the most innovative without being too technical."

== Selected discography ==
=== Yossi Fine & Ben Aylon ===
- Blue Desert (2018, Blue Desert Music)

=== Solo ===
- Live in Jerusalem (2007, EXS Music)
- "Peace Is the Answer" (single) – Skyler Jett & Yossi Fine (2012, First Kiss Records)

=== With Ex-Centric Sound System ===
- Electric Voodooland (2000, Relativity)
- West Nile Funk (2004, IndieLand/EXS)
- Afro Riddim Sessions, Vol. 1 (2006, In the Pocket Records)
- Live In San Francisco (2010, Avila Street Records)
- Premixes (2011, Avila Street Records)
- Re Spect (5-CD box set) (2011, Avila Street Records)

=== Featured on (playing bass) ===
- Rubén Blades – Nothing But the Truth (1988, Wounded Bird Records)
- Stanley Jordan – Cornucopia (1990, Blue Note Records)
- David Bowie – Outside (1995, Arista/BMG)
- Noa – Calling (1996, Geffen Records)
- Karsh Kale – Realize (2001, Six Degrees Records)
- Deepak Chopra – A Gift of Love, Vol. 2 (2002, Tommy Boy Records)
- Karsh Kale – Broken English (2006, Six Degrees Records)
- Cheb i Sabbah – Devotion (2008, Six Degrees Records)
- Vieux Farka Touré – Fondo (2009, Six Degrees Records)
- Vieux Farka Touré – Live (2010, Six Degrees Records)
- The Touré-Raichel Collective – The Tel Aviv Session (2012, Cumbancha)

=== Producer ===
- Shabak Samech - Shabak (1995, NMC)
- Shabak Samech - Be'atifa Shel Mamtak (1997, NMC) (trans: In A Candy Wrapper)
- Emil Zrihan – Ashkelon (1999, Piranha)
- Hamsa Lila – Gathering One (2003, BRG)
- Hadag Nahash – Lazuz (2003, Levantini)
- Hadag Nahash – Homer Mekomi (2004, Levantini)
- Eljuri - "En Paz" (2008, Manovill Records)
- Vieux Farka Touré – Fondo (2009, Six Degrees Records)
- Hadag Nahash – 6 (2010, HaTav HaShmini)
- Hassan Hackmooun- Unity 2014
- Yossi Fine&Ben Aylon- Blue Desert 2017
- Yossi Fine&Ben Aylon- Blue Desert Live 2020

== TV and film appearances ==
- The Tonight Show Starring Johnny Carson – performing with Ofra Haza (1989)
- The Tonight Show with Jay Leno – with Stanley Jordan (1989)
- The Arsenio Hall Show – with Me’Shell Ndegeocello (1994)
- The Word (BBC) – with Me’Shell Ndegeocello (2004)
- Awake Zion (dir. Monica Haim) (2005)
- The Prophecy (2005)
- The Making of Fondo (2009)
