= Hadag Nahash =

Israeli hip hop/funk band

Hadag Nahash הדג נחש
- The band's logo

Background information
- Origin: Jerusalem, Israel
- Genres: Israeli hip hop Hip-hop; Funk
- Years active: 1996–present
- Label: Hed Arzi
- Members: Sha'anan Streett; Guy Mar; David Klemes; Moshe "Atraf" Asaraf; Yaya Cohen-Harounoff; Shlomi Alon
- Past members: Shahar Mintz; Yaron Mohar; Meir Shalivo; Amir Ben Ami; Rafi Malkiel; Nir Mantzur
- Website: hadagnahash.com

Hadag Nahash (Hebrew: הדג נחש ha-Dag Nachash, [(h)aˈdaɡ naˈχaʃ]) is an Israeli hip hop and funk band, founded in 1996 in Jerusalem, which makes political statements in many of its protest songs.

== History ==
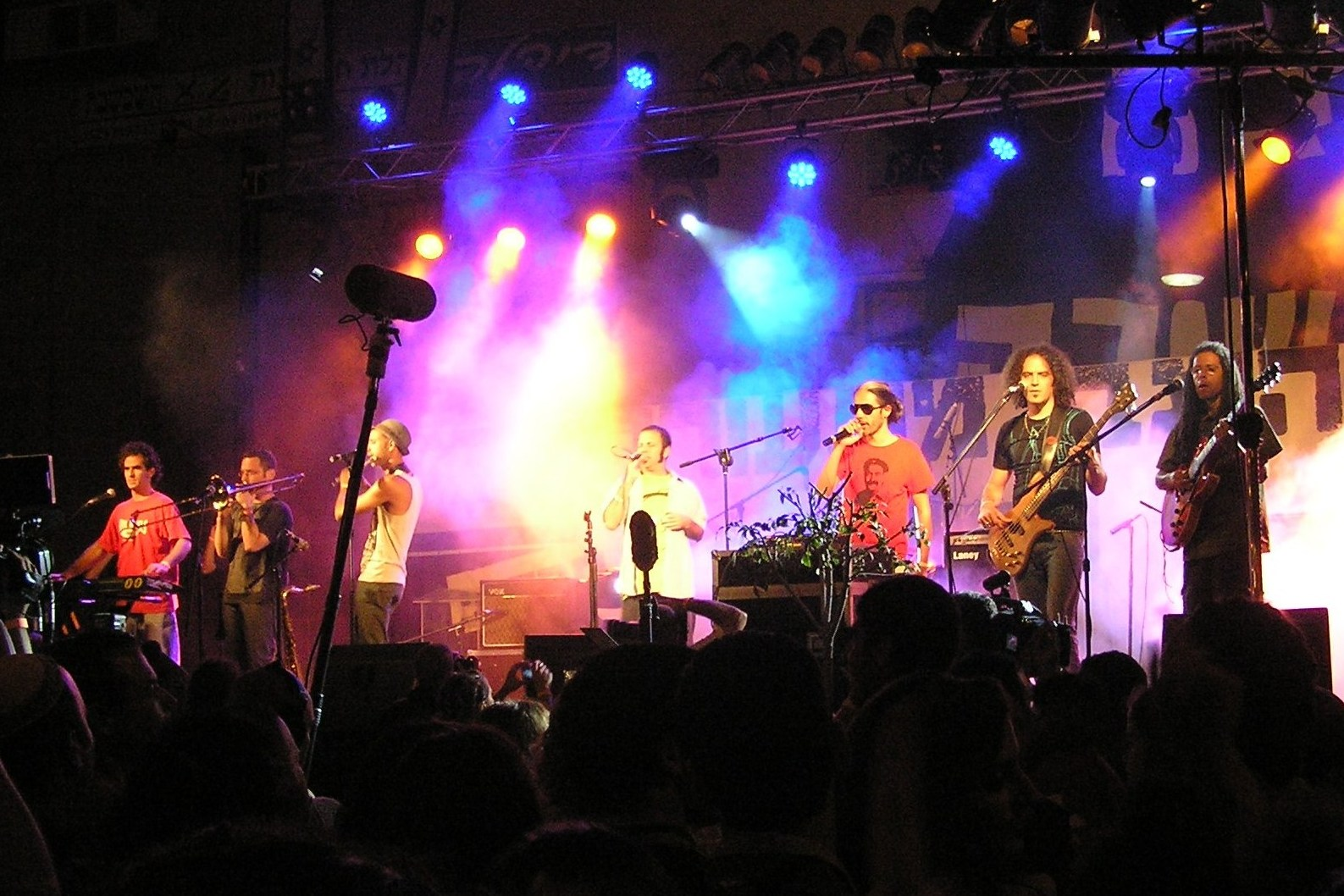
Concert in Beer Sheba, 2011

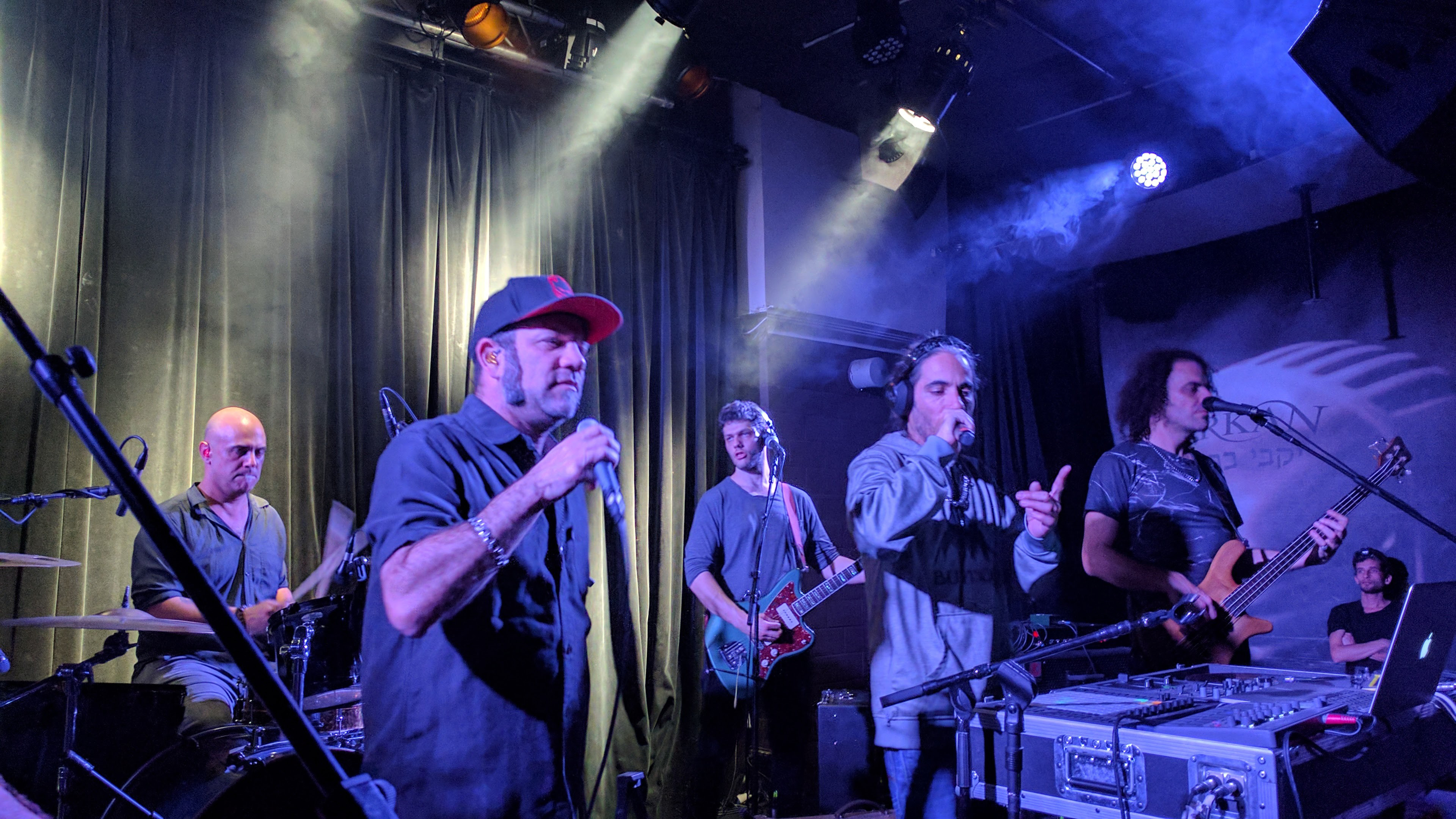
Concert in Tel Aviv, December 2016

Hadag Nahash has been a major contributor to the Israeli hip-hop scene, and is presently one of Israel's most successful bands, with eight studio albums released to date. The band's songs call for peace, tolerance and equality, and include political and social protest. Most songs are written by Sha'anan Streett, the band's lead vocalist. "We demand the freedom to write whatever we want at any given time, and that can be about, for example, marijuana or just having a good time, as well as social injustice. It’s not one or the other. Our lives contain both. And when we want to keep it real, we have to speak about both."

Yossi Fine also produced the band's third studio album, "Homer Mekomi" (חומר מקומי, "Local Material"), which was released in 2004. The biggest hit out of the album was "Shirat Hasticker" (שירת הסטיקר, "The Sticker Song"), which was written by Israeli novelist David Grossman.

In 2006, Hadag Nahash released their fourth studio album, "Be'ezrat Hajam" (בעזרת הג'אם, With Help of the Jam, a wordplay on the expression "With God's Help"), which was named Album of the Year at the Israel Music Awards. The album, recorded at In the Pocket studios in California, was the first album in which the vocals were divided equally between Sha'anan Streett and DJ Guy Mar. "Be'ezrat Hajam" contained the hit "Hine Ani Ba" (Hebrew: הנה אני בא, "Here I Come") written by Guy Mar about moving from his hometown Jerusalem to Tel Aviv. "Hine Ani Ba" is also an example of a song with a political or cultural message, as it depicts a cultural struggle between Jerusalem, a symbol of Israel's heritage, and Tel Aviv, a hub for young people and nightlife.

In December 2009, Hadag Nahash released the first single from its sixth album (fifth studio album), 6: a protest song against the rising internal violence in Israeli society, called "Od Ach Ehad" (עוד אח אחד, "One More Brother").

Their second-most recent song, Bomba, was released as a single on 3 August 2020 and was produced by Johnny Goldstein. The lyrics reference ongoing protests against the thirty-fifth government of Israel, calling to "break the cycle of Miri, Bibi, Miki, Bibi, Benny, Bibi" and asking for the release of Avera Mengistu.

== Band members ==
=== Current members ===
- Sha'anan Streett (שאנן סטריט) - Rapping, Vocals (1996–present)
- Yair "Yaya" Cohen-Aharonov (יאיר "יאיא" כהן־אהרונוב) - Bass guitar, Backing vocals (1996–present)
- David "Dudush" Klemes (דוד "דודוש" קלמס) - Keyboard (1996–present)
- Moshe "Atraf" Asaraf (משה "אטרף" אסרף) - Drums (1996–present)
- Guy "DJ Guy Mar" Margalit (מרגלית "DJ גיא "גיא מר) - Rapping, Vocals, Turntables, Sampling (1998–present)
- Shlomi Alon (שלומי אלון) - Saxophone, Flute, EWI, Rapping, Vocals (2001–present)

=== Former members ===
- Shahar Mintz ((שחר מינץ- Guitar (1996-1998)
- Yaron Mohar (ירון מוהר)- Saxophone (1996-2001)
- Meir Shalivo (מאיר שליבו)- Trumpet (1996-2000)
- Amir Ben Ami (אמיר בן־עמי)- Guitar (1998-2007)
- Rafi Malkiel (רפי מלכיאל)- Trombone (2000-2003)

== Discography ==
=== Studio albums ===
- Hamechona Shell HaGroove (Hebrew: המכונה של הגרוב, lit. "The Groove Machine") - 2000
- Lazuz (Hebrew: לזוז, lit. "Move") - 2003
- Khomer Mekomi (Hebrew: חומר מקומי, lit. "Local Material") - 2004
- Bezrat Ha'jam (Hebrew: בעזרת הג'אם, lit. "With the Jam's Help") - 2006
- 6 - 2010
- Zman Lehitorer (Hebrew: זמן להתעורר, lit. "Time to Wake Up") - 2013
- Shutafim Ba'am (Hebrew: שותפים בעם, lit. "Partners in the People/Nation") - 2016
- Welcome to Izrael (Hebrew: וולקאם טו איזראל) - 2018
- Dag Life (Hebrew: דג לייף, lit. "Fish Life") - 2023
- Yabia Omer (Hebrew: יביע אומר, lit. "He Will Utter") - 2025

=== Live albums ===
- Live (Hebrew: לייב) - 2008
