= Muso Ko =

Studio album by Habib Koité & Bamada
- Released: April 1, 1995
- Genres: African pop, Mande, Afro-jazz
- Length: 53:33
- Label: Contre-Jour

Habib Koité & Bamada chronology
Muso Ko (1995)	Ma Ya (1997)

Professional ratings
Review scores
Source	Rating
Allmusic	link

Muso Ko is the debut album by Habib Koité & Bamada. Two of the songs, "I Ka Barra" and "Din Din Wo", are included in the Sample Music package included with Windows Vista. The album is available on iTunes.

== Track listing ==
No.	Title	Length
1.	"I Ka Barra"	5:00
2.	"Muso Ko"	4:36
3.	"Den Ko"	5:11
4.	"Nanalé"	5:21
5.	"Fatma"	6:15
6.	"Sira Bulu"	4:41
7.	"Nimato"	4:05
8.	"Cigarette Abana"	4:21
9.	"Din Din Wo"	4:45
10.	"Kunfe Ta"	4:53
11.	"Koulandian"	4:43
