= Cabra Casay =

Israeli singer

Cabra Casay כברה קסאי
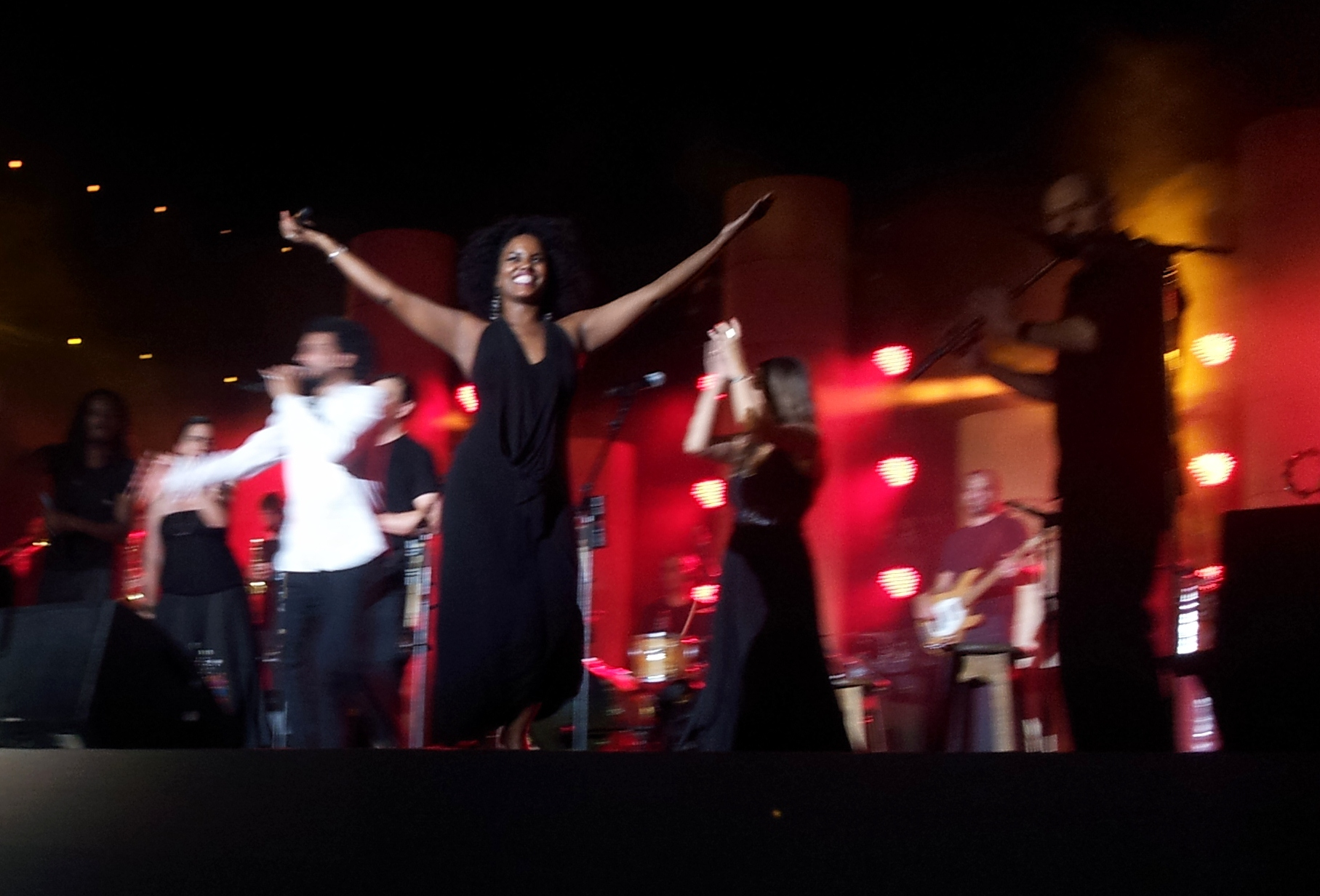
- Cabra Casay

Background information
- Born: Cabra Casay; August 3, 1982 (age 44); Sudan
- Genres: Folk; world; pop
- Occupation: Singer
- Years active: 2003–present
- Formerly of: Idan Raichel Project

Cabra Casay (Hebrew: כברה קסאי) is an Israeli singer, best known for her work alongside Idan Raichel in the Idan Raichel Project (Hebrew: הפרוייקט של עידן רייכל).

Casay was born in a refugee camp in Sudan on August 3, 1982 to Ethiopian Jewish parents who had left Ethiopia to emigrate to Israel as part of Operation Moses. She arrived in Israel in 1983, when she was one year old. Upon arrival in Israel, the family lived in Ma'alot-Tarshiha, and two years later they moved to Kiryat Malakhi, where she grew up.

At age 18, she began her mandatory military service in the IDF, where she met Idan Raichel. Together, they performed in many military camps and facilities. When they left the army, the Idan Raichel project was acclaimed as a success, and they performed all over Israel and even went on some offshore tours.

Casay took part in the first season of the Israeli version of American Idol, Kochav Nolad, where she reached the top 8. Her most famous song is Habaytah, Haloch Chazor, which means "Home, Back and Forth."

Casay is known for her use of Arab and Ethiopian vocal techniques such as ululation.
