= Lero-Lero =

Studio album by Luísa Maita
- Released: July 27, 2010 (US)
- Genre: Samba; jazz; bossa nova; MPB
- Label: Cumbancha

Luísa Maita chronology
Lero-Lero (2010)	Maita Remixed (2010)

Lero-Lero is the debut studio album by Brazilian artist Luísa Maita, released on July 27, 2010 through the independent label Cumbancha. The album features a variety of sounds from samba and bossa nova to western jazz and downtempo electronic. Lero-Lero precedes two different remixed versions of the album: Maita Remixed and its DJ Edition.

== Track listing ==
No.	Title	Length
1.	"Lero-Lero"	4:43
2.	"Alento"	3:29
3.	"Ai Vem Ele"	4:12
4.	"Desencabulada"	3:01
5.	"Fulaninha"	3:35
6.	"Mire a Veja"	4:36
7.	"Maria e Moleque"	4:20
8.	"Anunciou"	3:14
9.	"Um Vento Bom"	3:49
10.	"Alivio"	3:33
11.	"Amor e Paz"	2:44
