= Joe Driscoll (rapper) =

American musician & politician (born 1979)

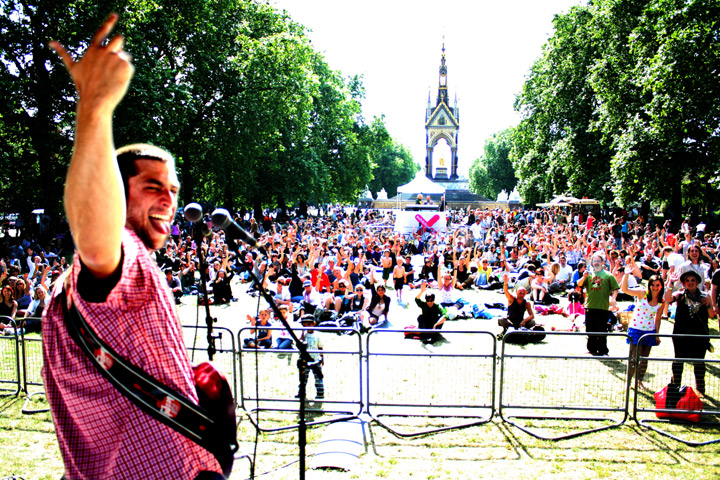
- Driscoll performing in 2009

Common Councillor of Syracuse, New York
- In office 2018–2022
- Constituency: 5th District

Personal details
- Born: April 12, 1979 (age 47) Syracuse, New York
- Party: Democratic

Joe Driscoll (born April 12, 1979) is an American rapper, musician, beatboxer, and politician who uses different styles and instruments while performing. Joe currently serves as a District Councilor on the Common Council in Syracuse, New York.

== Career ==
Driscoll was born on April 12, 1979 in Syracuse, New York. He performs solo, and uses recorded loops of his own beatboxing, and live looping using a sampler to fuse hip-hop, reggae, soul, folk and roots rock. He began performing as a solo folk artist around the age of 14, and became a full-time musician in his early 20s. His first real band was "The Groove Merchants" and his first album was "Straight Butta Hits." Although the band was more of a high school band in nature, they took a lot of influence from The Dave Matthews Band and Bob Marley. They also sampled from The Rolling Stones along with many other artists during their live performances.

Driscoll was signed by 3rdegree Ltd while touring the United Kingdom in 2004. He was then signed up to London label Buttercuts Records and subsequently went on to record the album Origin Myths. Origin Myths combines beatbox drums (oral percussion) with layers of guitar, mbira, bass, verse, and rhyme, which means that he is often described as a "one man band".

During 2007 and 2008, Driscoll has toured with Dirty Pretty Things, Regina Spektor, Coldcut, and The Sugar Hill Gang at events in the US and Europe. He has performed at UK festivals including Big Chill, Bestival and Glastonbury Festival, and at the Lake of Stars Festival (Malawi, Africa). He received an INDY Award for Best Solo Act in 2007.

His newest album, Mixtape Champs was released on 20 December 2010.

== Discography ==
- Faya (together with Sekou Kouyate)
- Mixtape Champs (2010)
- Origin Myths (2006) Buttercuts (CD + DVD)
- Life as a Monkey (2006)
- Little Beat Big (2003)
