= Marta Gómez =

Colombian singer and songwriter

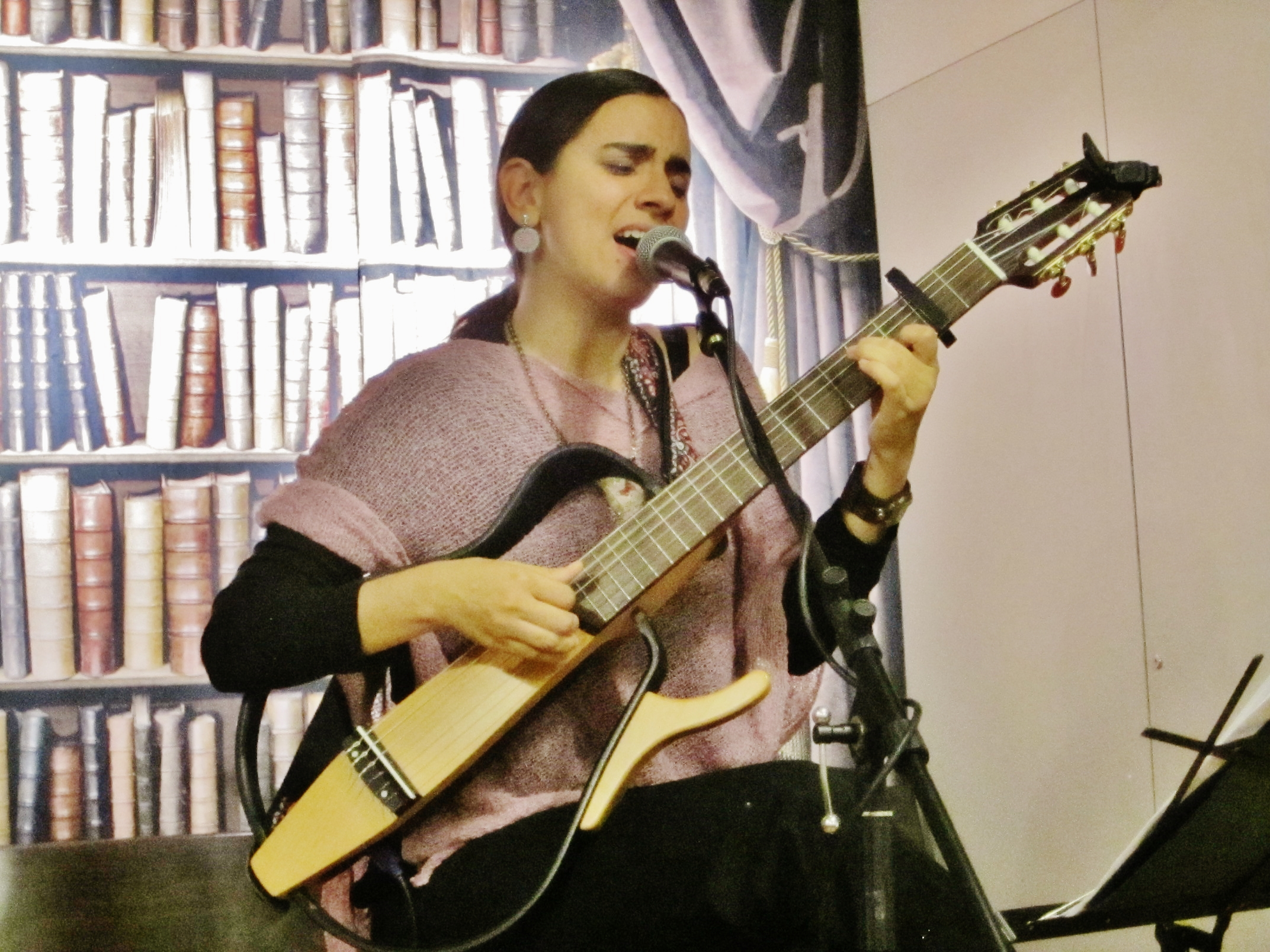
Marta Gómez in 2013

Marta Gómez is a Colombian singer and songwriter.

== Life and Career ==
After obtaining a Best Achievement Scholarship, she graduated magna cum laude from the Berklee College of Music.

She currently lives in Barcelona.

Gómez and her group perform a large repertoire of songs with a mixture of rhythms that range from Latin jazz to folk Latin American music. They have shared the stage with well-known musicians from various countries around the world. She was nominated for the 2004 Latin Billboard Music Awards in the category "Latin Jazz Album of the Year". In 2014, she won a Latin Grammy Award for Best Latin Children's Album for Coloreando: Traditional Songs for Children in Spanish. In 2014, Marta Gómez, seeing how the conflict between Israel and Palestine was escalating, composed the song Para la guerra nada, in 2017 Marta Gómez was invited to sing it at the world summit of the El Testigo on the work of Colombian photographer Jesús Abad Colorado. By 2020, this song was turned into an illustrated book, in which the spirit of peace is the protagonist.

== Discography ==
- (2018) la alegria y el canto
- (2016) Canciones de Sol
- (2014) Este instante
- (2013) De Colores
- (2011) Canciones de Luna
- (2011) El corazón y el sombrero
- (2011) Afri-Spaans 2
- (2010) Afri-Spaans
- (2009) Musiquita
- (2006) Entre Cada Palabra
- (2004) Cantos de Agua Dulce
- (2003) Sólo es vivir
- (2001) Marta Gómez
