= Helicon (record label) =

Helicon Records
- Founded: 1985
- Founder: Itzik Alsheikh; Ronny Brown
- Genre: Various
- Country of origin: Israel
- Official website: www.helicon.co.il

Helicon (Hebrew: הליקון) is an Israeli record label.

== History ==
Helicon Records was founded in 1985. Aside from being the label of many Israeli singers, Helicon was the exclusive distributor of Snapper Music, EMI and Universal Music Group (replacing PolyGram) in Israel. In 2012, Helicon acquired the distribution rights of High Fidelity, another Israeli record label.

Its founders, Itzik Alsheich and Roni Brown, decided to name it after the mountain "Helikon" in Greece, "which, according to Greek mythology, was the home of the nine Muses: the goddesses of creativity, arts and sciences, whose main role was to inspire creators, especially poets, musicians and philosophers".

In late 2015, the company began releasing vinyl records again after a hiatus of more than 20 years. In 2021, Itzik Alsheich bought Ronnie Brown's stake in the company and then merged it with the record label "Aroma Music" to create "Helicon Aroma Music Group".

== See also ==
- List of record labels
- Music of Israel
